= Fish scale =

Hard skeletal covering of fish

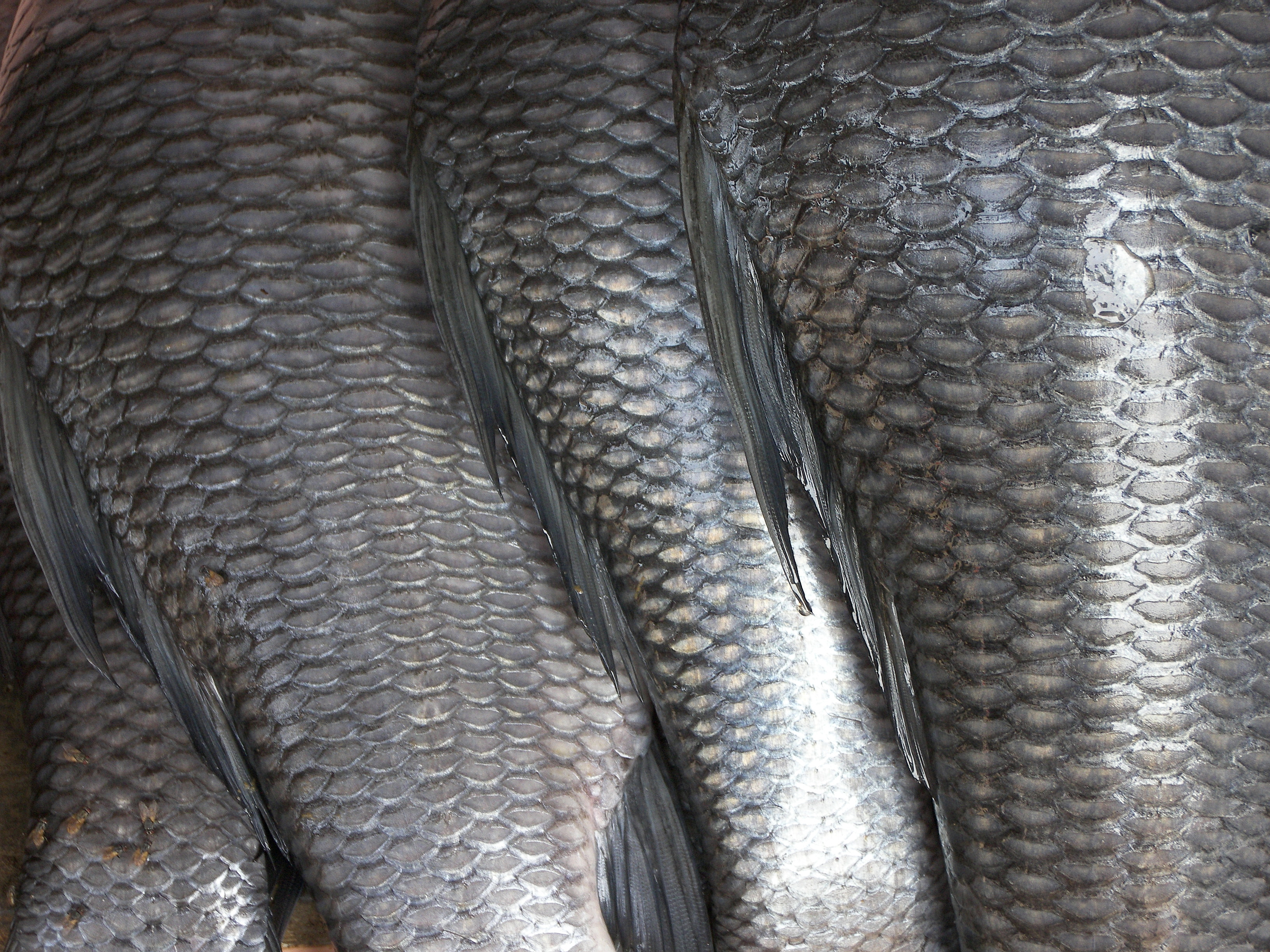
Cycloid scales cover these teleost fish (rohu).

A fish scale is a small rigid plate that grows out of the skin of a fish. The skin of most jawed fishes is covered with these protective scales, which can also provide effective camouflage through the use of reflection and colouration, as well as possible hydrodynamic advantages. The term scale derives from the Old French escale, meaning a shell pod or husk.

Scales vary enormously in size, shape, structure, and extent, ranging from strong and rigid armour plates in fishes such as shrimpfishes and boxfishes, to microscopic or absent in fishes such as eels and anglerfishes. The morphology of a scale can be used to identify the species of fish it came from. Scales originated within the jawless ostracoderms, ancestors to all jawed fishes today. Most bony fishes are covered with the cycloid scales of salmon and carp, the ctenoid scales of perch, or the ganoid scales of sturgeons and gars. Cartilaginous fishes (sharks and rays) are covered with placoid scales. Some species are covered instead by scutes, and others have no outer covering on part or all of the skin.

Fish scales are part of the fish's integumentary system, and are produced from the mesoderm layer of the dermis, which distinguishes them from reptile scales. The same genes involved in tooth and hair development in mammals are also involved in scale development. The placoid scales of cartilaginous fishes are also called dermal denticles and are structurally homologous with vertebrate teeth. Most fish are also covered in a layer of mucus or slime which can protect against pathogens such as bacteria, fungi, and viruses, and reduce surface resistance when the fish swims.

== Thelodont scales ==
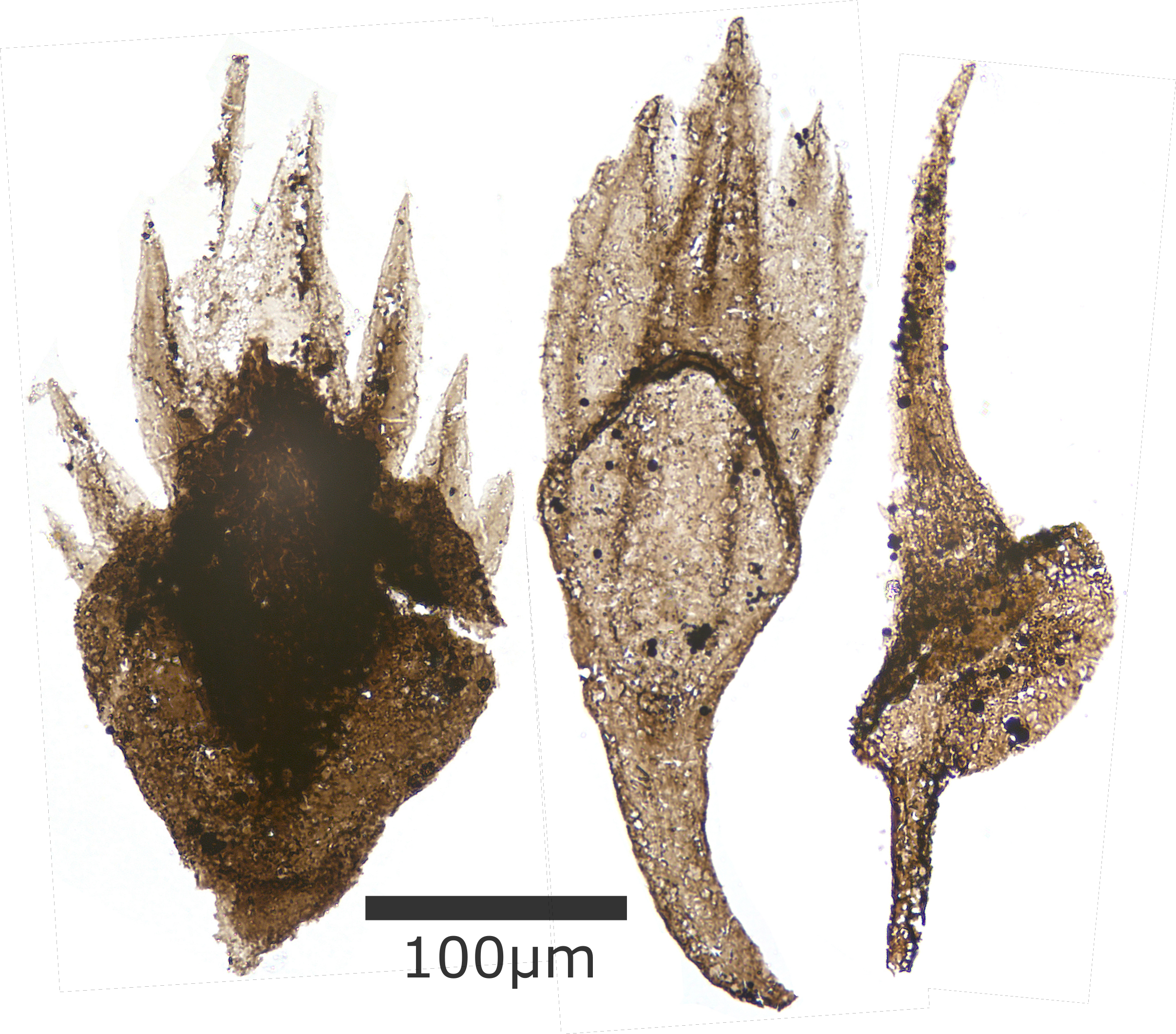
Left to right: denticles of Paralogania, Shielia taiti, Lanarkia horrida

The bony scales of thelodonts, the most abundant form of fossil fish, are well understood. The scales were formed and shed throughout the organisms' lifetimes, and quickly separated after their death.

Bone, a tissue that is both resistant to mechanical damage and relatively prone to fossilization, often preserves internal detail, which allows the histology and growth of the scales to be studied in detail. The scales comprise a non-growing "crown" composed of dentine, with a sometimes-ornamented enameloid upper surface and an aspidin base. Its growing base is made of cell-free bone, which sometimes developed anchorage structures to fix it in the side of the fish. Beyond that, there appear to be five types of bone growth, which may represent five natural groupings within the thelodonts, or a spectrum ranging between the end members meta- (or ortho-) dentine and mesodentine tissues. Each of the five scale morphs appears to resemble the scales of more derived groupings of fish, suggesting that thelodont groups may have been stem groups to succeeding clades of fish.

However, using scale morphology alone to distinguish species has some pitfalls. Within each organism, scale shape varies hugely according to body area, with intermediate forms appearing between different areas, and scale morphology may not even be constant within one area. Furthermore, scale morphologies are not unique to taxa, and may be indistinguishable on the same area of two different species.

The morphology and histology of thelodonts provides the main tool for quantifying their diversity and distinguishing between species, although ultimately using such convergent traits is prone to errors. Nonetheless, a framework comprising three groups has been proposed based upon scale morphology and histology. Comparisons to modern shark species have shown that thelodont scales were functionally similar to those of modern cartilaginous fish and, likewise, has allowed an extensive comparison between ecological niches.

== Cosmoid scales ==
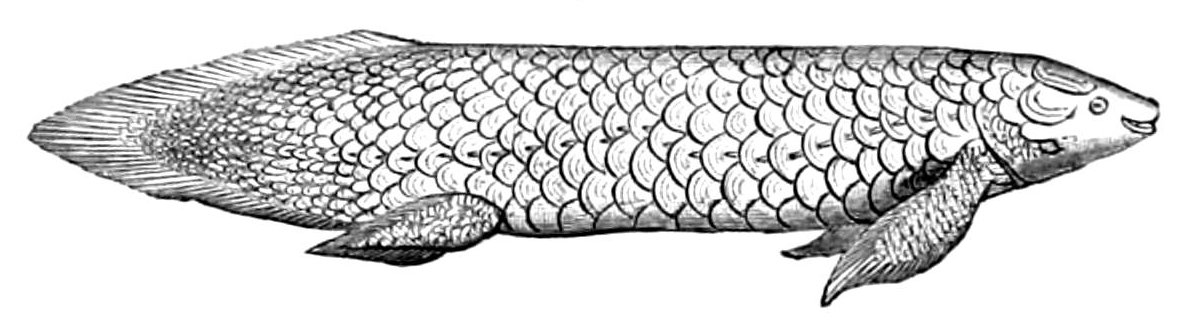
Queensland lungfish

Cosmoid scales are found only on ancient lobe-finned fishes, including some of the earliest lungfishes (subclass Dipnoi), and in Crossopterygii, including the living coelacanth in a modified form (see elasmoid scales, below). They were probably derived from a fusion of placoid-ganoid scales. The inner part of the scales is made of dense lamellar bone called isopedine. On top of this lies a layer of spongy or vascular bone supplied with blood vessels, followed by a complex dentine-like layer called cosmine with a superficial outer coating of vitrodentine. The upper surface is keratin. Cosmoid scales increase in size through the growth of the lamellar bone layer.

== Elasmoid scales ==
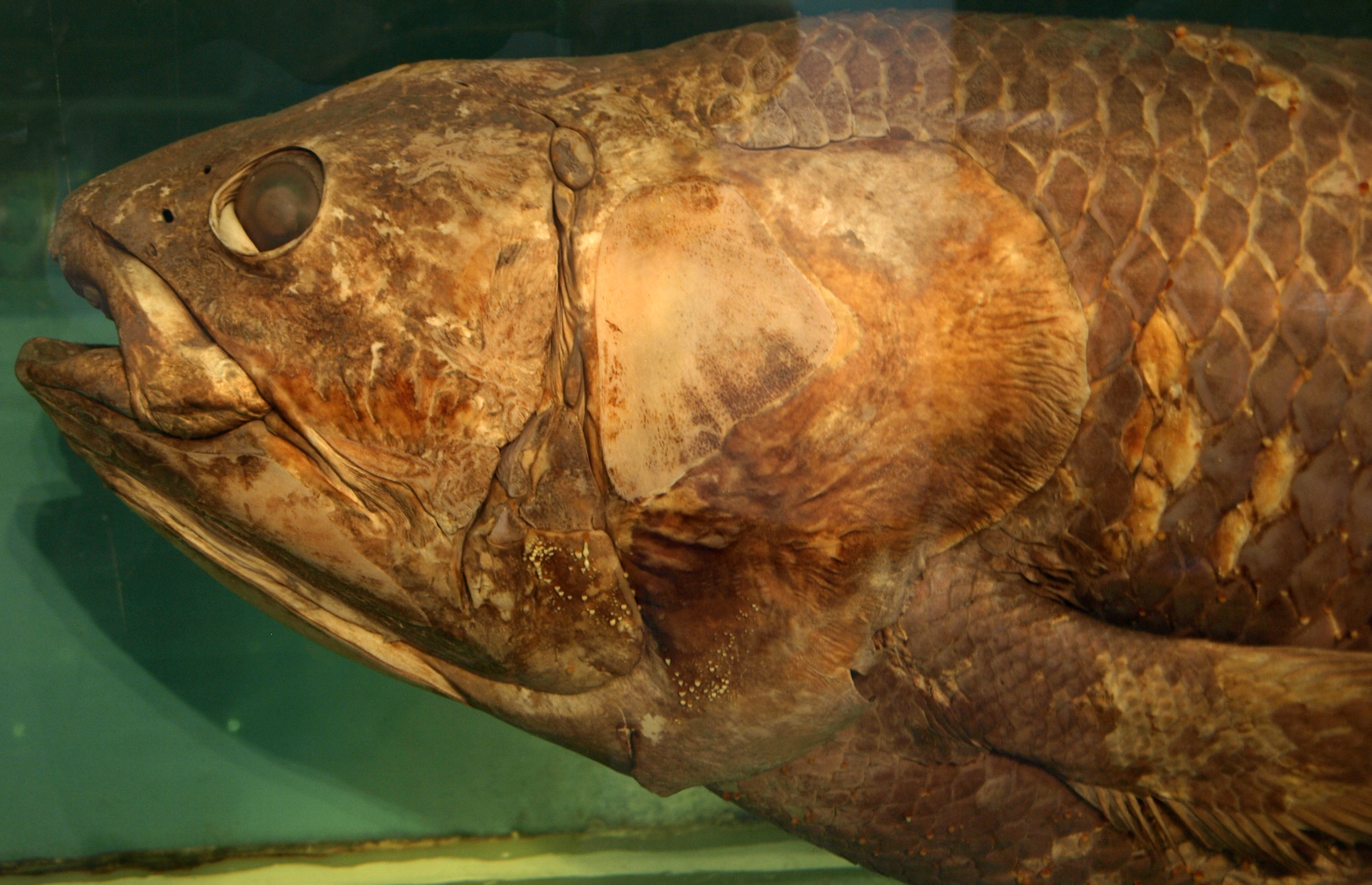
Lobe-finned fishes, like this preserved coelacanth, have elasmoid scales.

Elasmoid scales are thin, imbricated scales composed of a layer of dense, lamellar collagen bone called isopedine, above which is a layer of tubercles usually composed of bone, as in Eusthenopteron. The layer of dentine that was present in the first lobe-finned fish is usually reduced, as in the extant coelacanth, or entirely absent, as in extant lungfish and in the Devonian Eusthenopteron. Elasmoid scales have appeared several times over the course of fish evolution. They are present in some lobe-finned fishes, including all extant and some extinct lungfishes, as well as the coelacanths which have modified cosmoid scales that lack cosmine and are thinner than true cosmoid scales. They are also present in some tetrapodomorphs like Eusthenopteron, amiids, and teleosts, whose cycloid and ctenoid scales represent the least mineralized elasmoid scales.

Zebrafish elasmoid scales are used in the lab to study bone mineralization process, and can be cultured (kept) outside of the organism.

== Ganoid scales ==
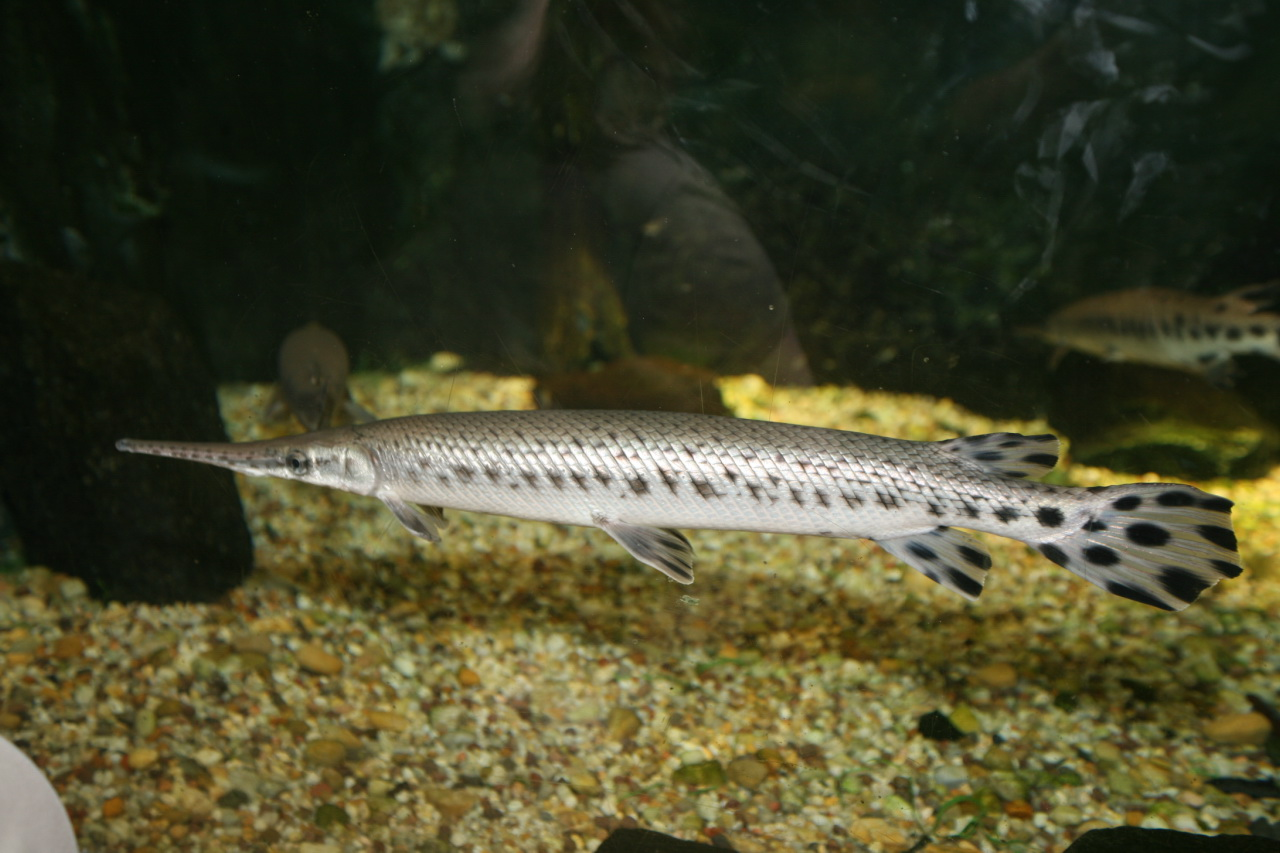
The scales of this spotted gar appear glassy due to ganoine.

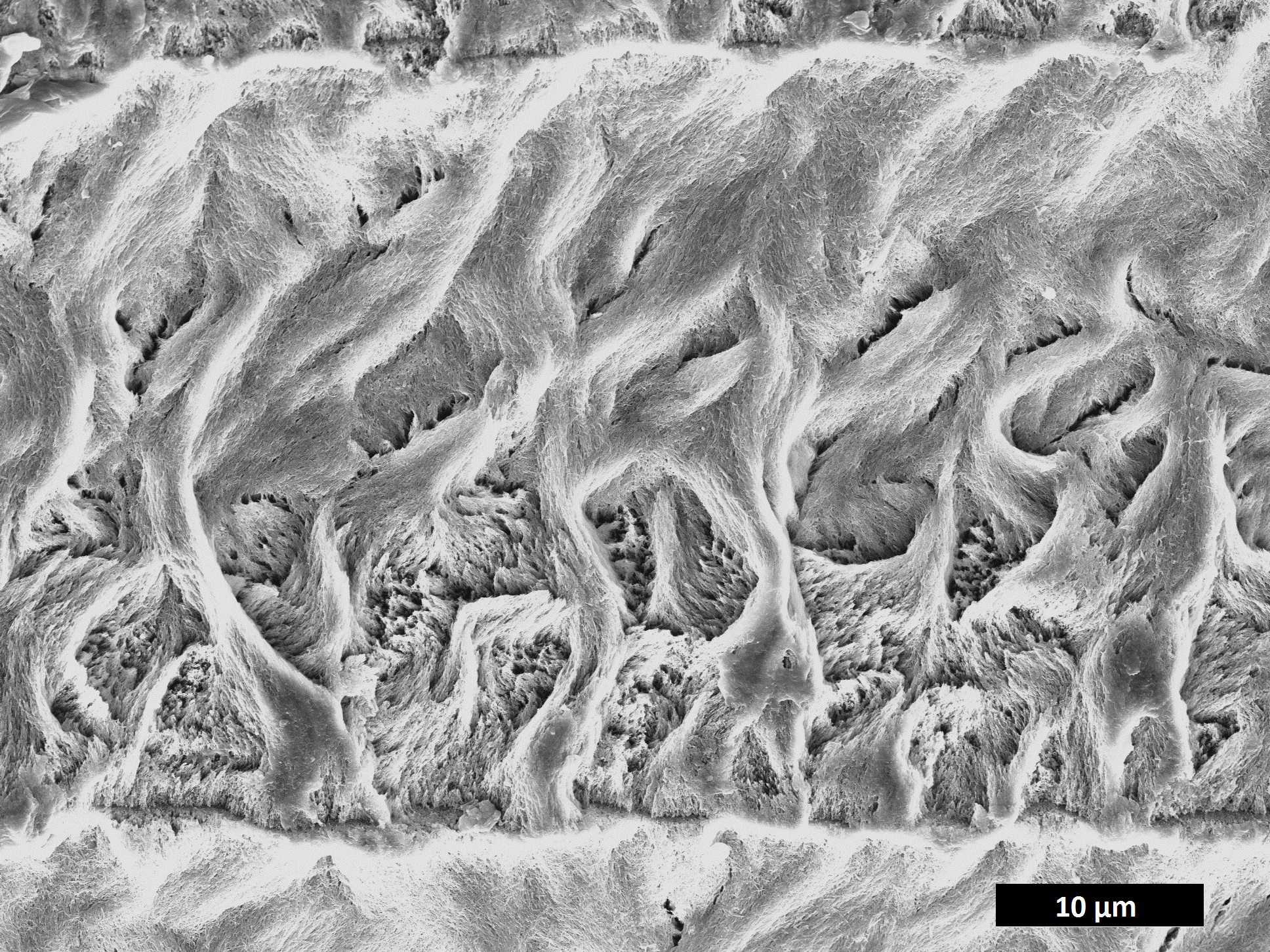
Mineral texture of ganoine layers in the scales of an alligator gar

Ganoid scales are found in the sturgeons, paddlefishes, gars, bowfin, and bichirs. They are derived from cosmoid scales and often have serrated edges. They are covered with a layer of hard enamel-like dentine in the place of cosmine, and a layer of inorganic bone salt called ganoine in place of vitrodentine.

Ganoine is a characteristic component of ganoid scales. It is a glassy, often multi-layered mineralized tissue that covers the scales, as well as the cranial bones and fin rays in some non-teleost osteichthyans, such as gars, bichirs, and coelacanths. It is composed of rod-like apatite crystallites. Ganoine is an ancient feature of ray-finned fishes, being found, for example, on the scales of stem group actinopterygian Cheirolepis. While often considered a synapomorphic character of ray-finned fishes, ganoine or ganoine-like tissues are also found on the extinct acanthodii. It has been suggested that ganoine is homologous to tooth enamel in vertebrates or can even considered a type of enamel.

Amblypterus striatus	Ganoid scales of the extinct Carboniferous fish, Amblypterus striatus. (a) shows the outer surface of four of the scales, and (b) shows the inner surface of two of the scales. Each of the rhomboidal-shaped ganoid scales of Amblypterus has a ridge on the inner surface which is produced at one end into a projecting peg which fits into a notch in the next scale, similar to the manner in which tiles are pegged together on the roof of a house.

Most ganoid scales are rhomboidal (diamond-shaped) and connected by peg-and-socket joints. They are usually thick and fit together more like a jigsaw rather than overlapping like other scales. In this way, ganoid scales are nearly impenetrable and are excellent protection against predation.

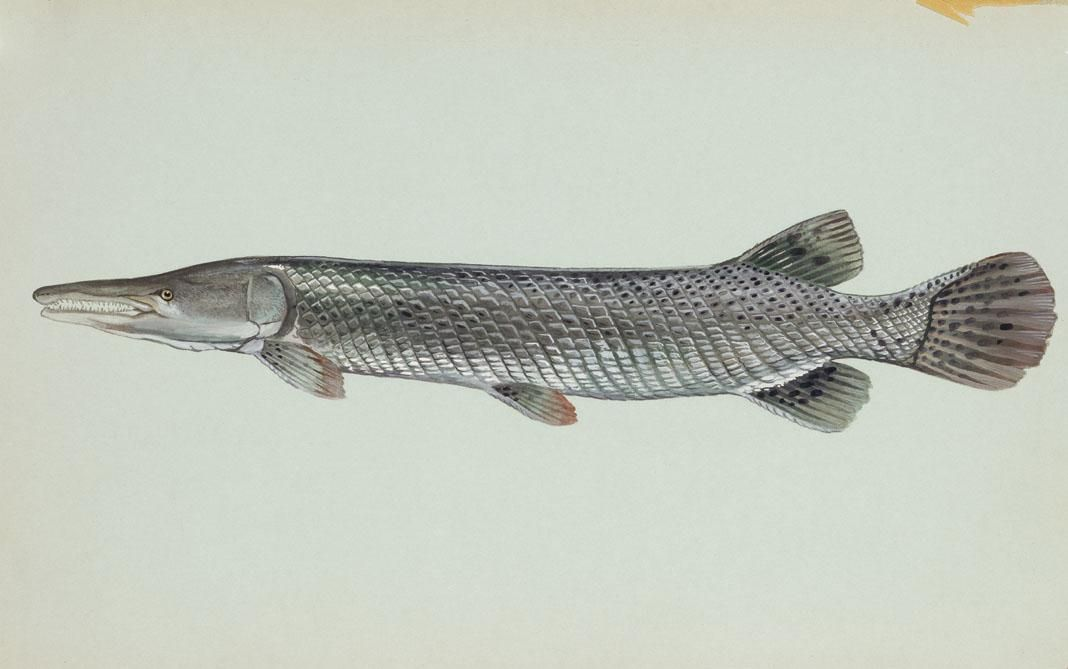
The alligator gar has a tough armouring of rhomboidal-shaped ganoid scales.

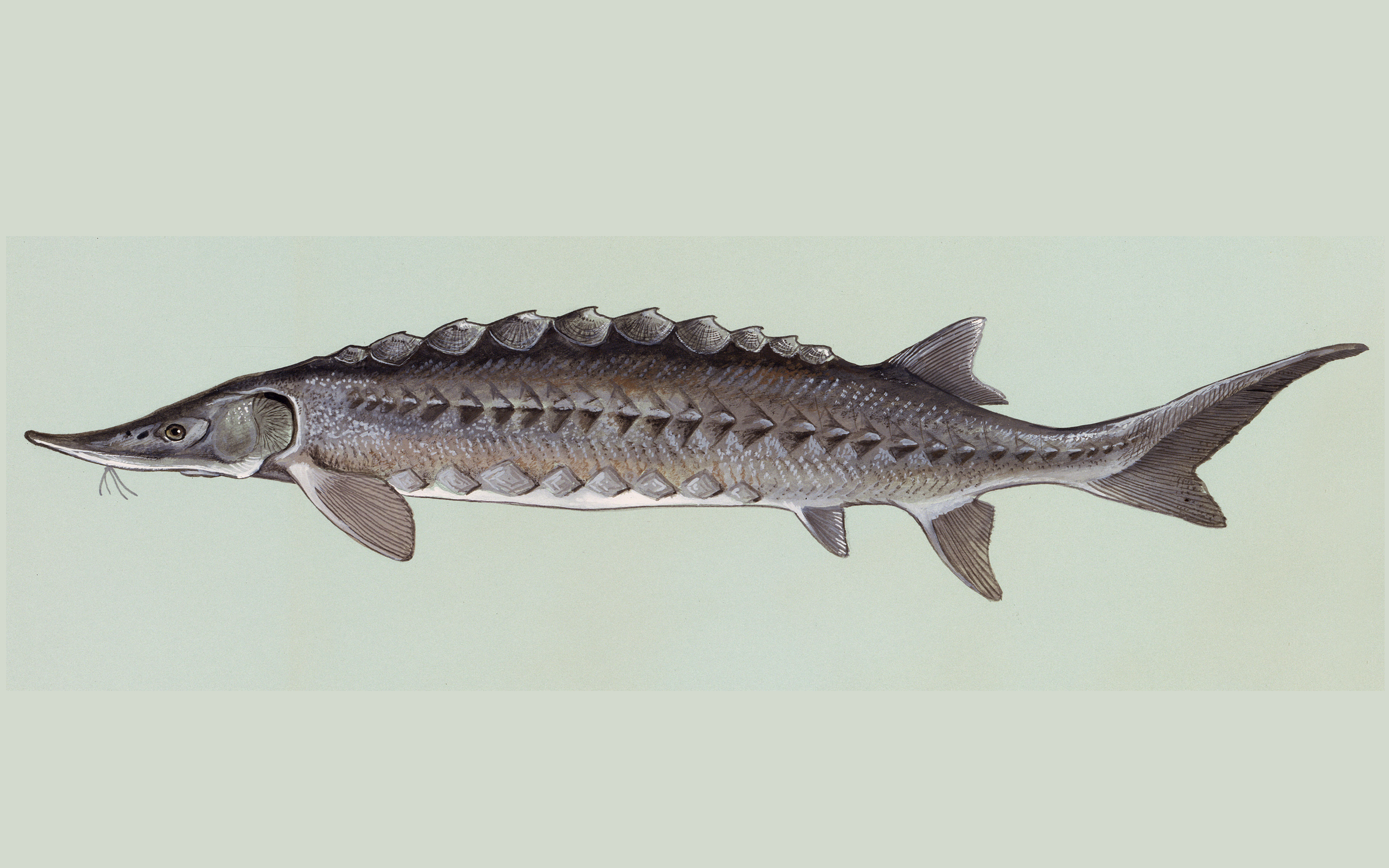
The sturgeon has rows of ganoid scales enlarged into scute-like armour plates.

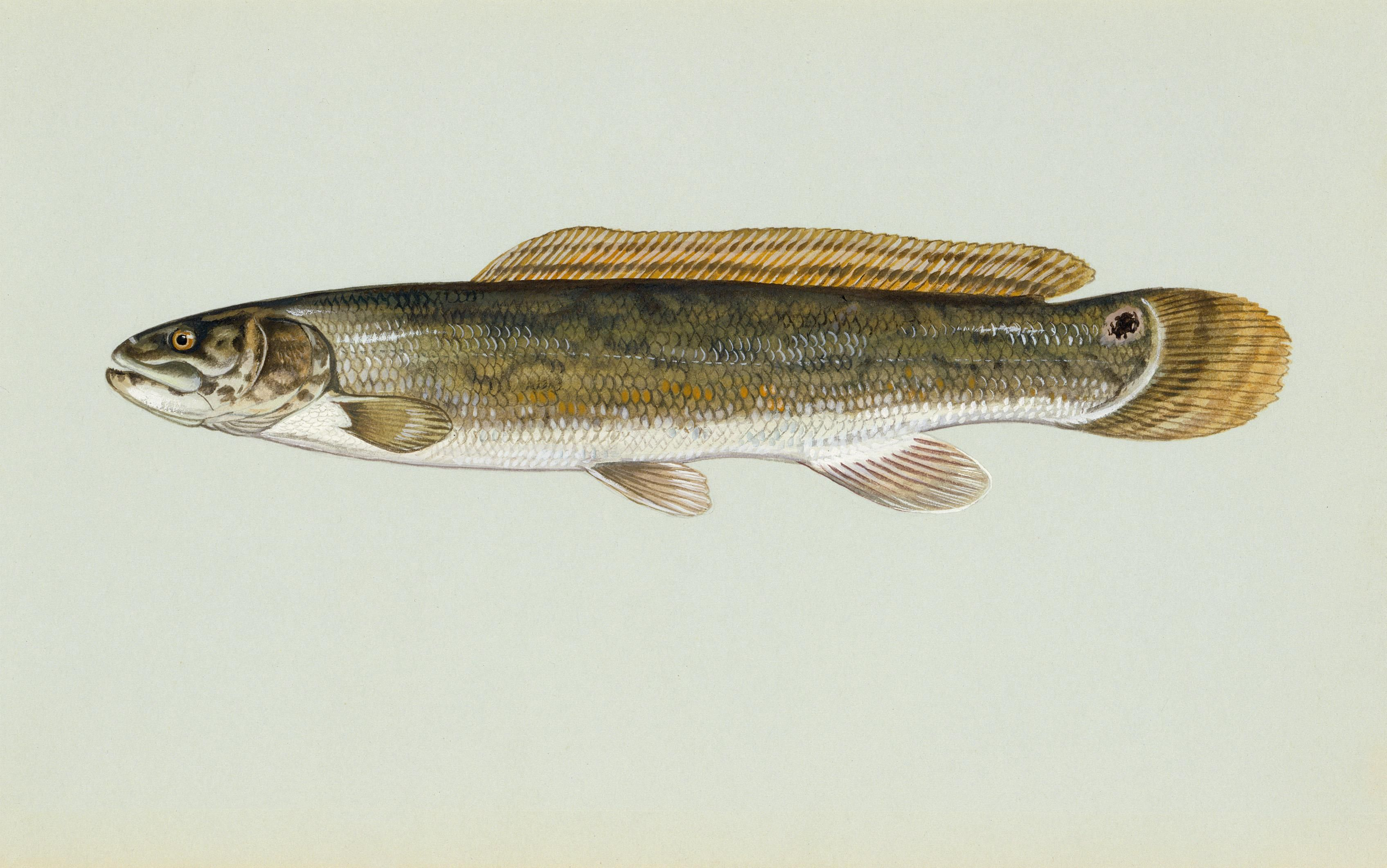
The ganoid scales on a bowfin are reduced in size and resemble cycloid scales.

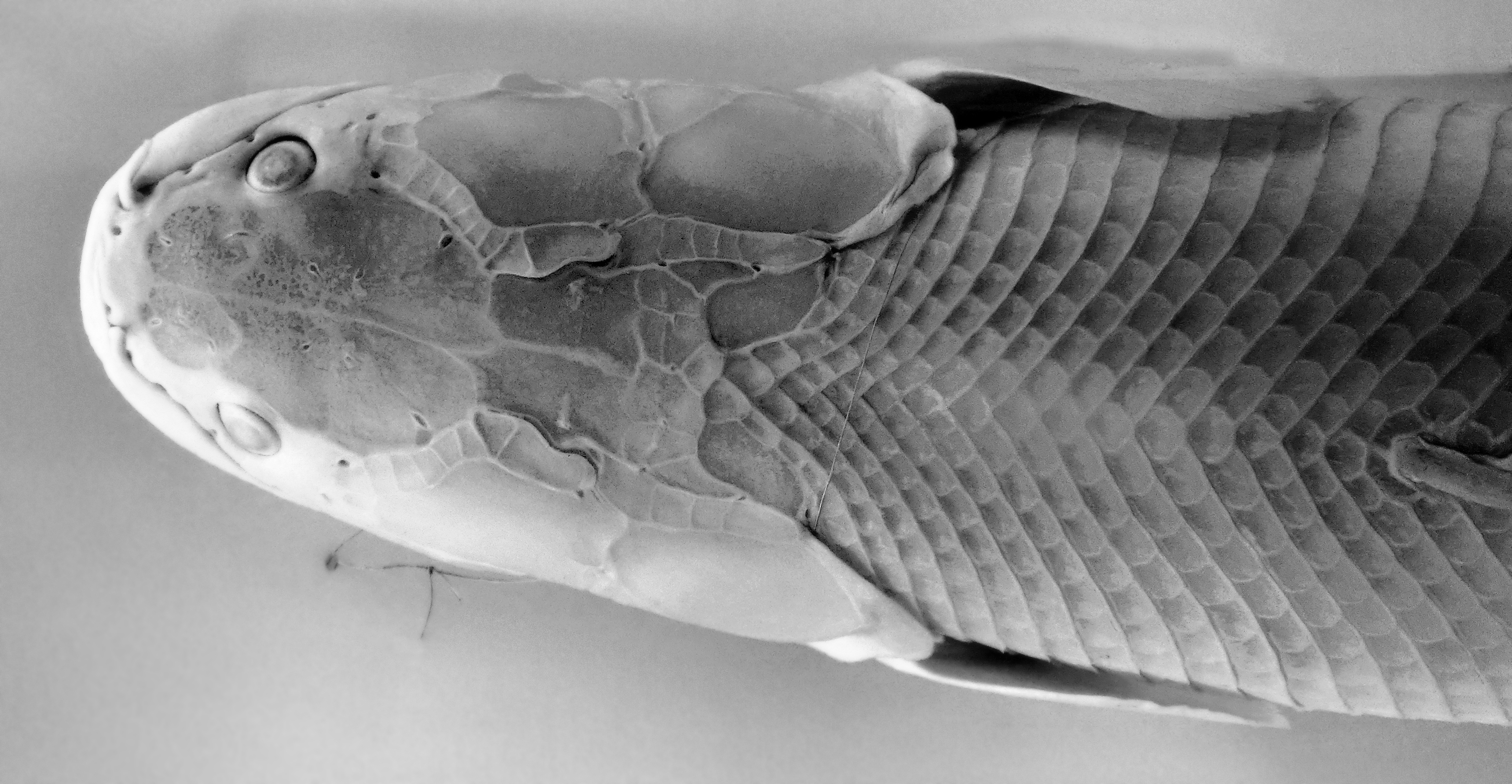
Geometrically laid out ganoid scales on a bichir

In sturgeons, the scales are greatly enlarged into armour plates along the sides and back, while, in the bowfin, the scales are greatly reduced in thickness to resemble cycloid scales.

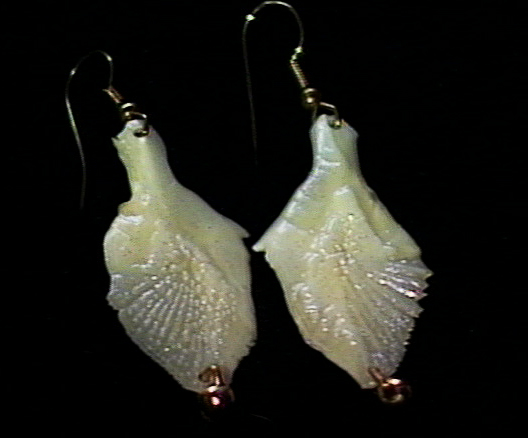
Earrings made from the ganoid scales of an alligator gar

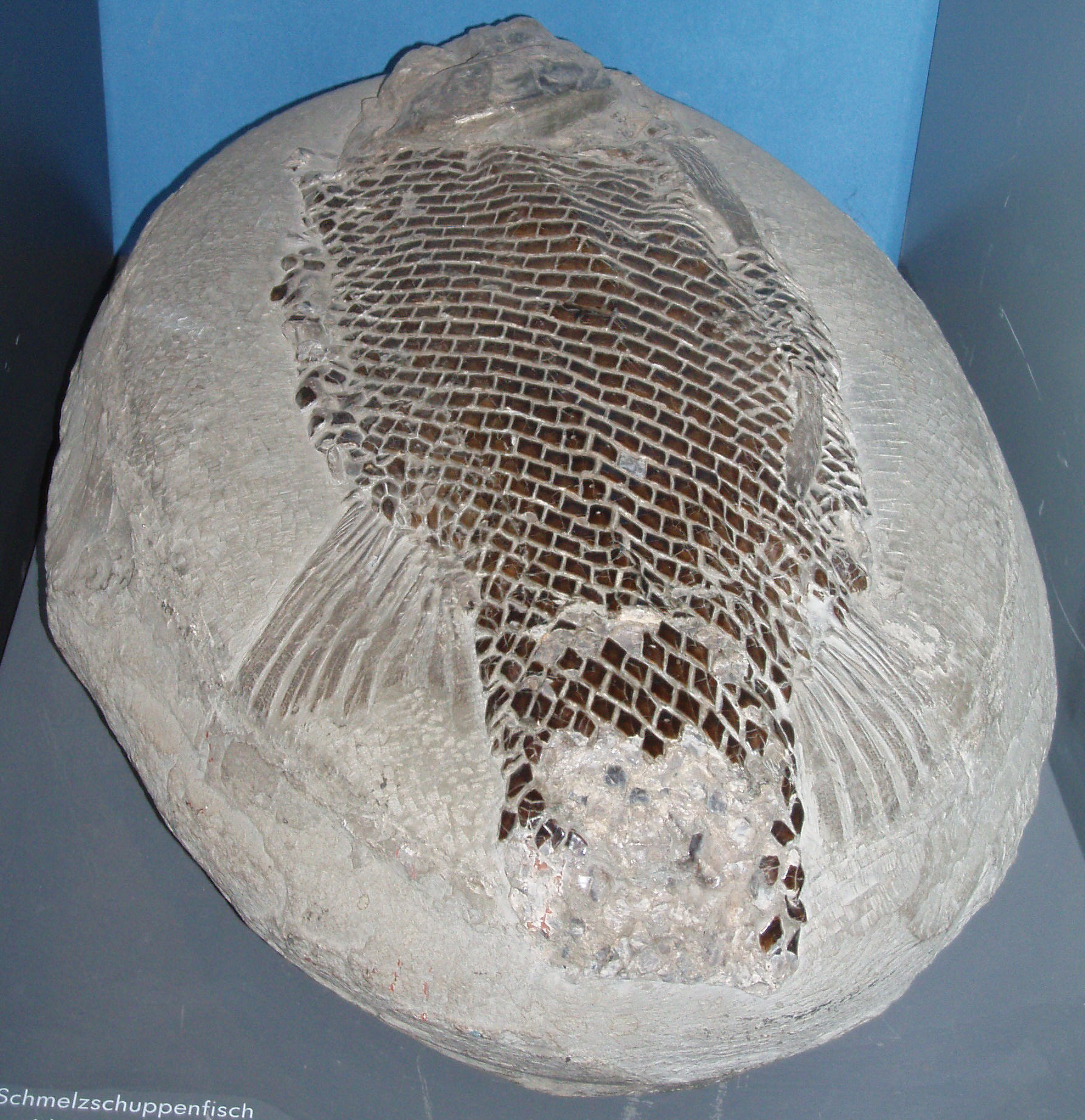
Fossil of a primitive rayfin with ganoid scales

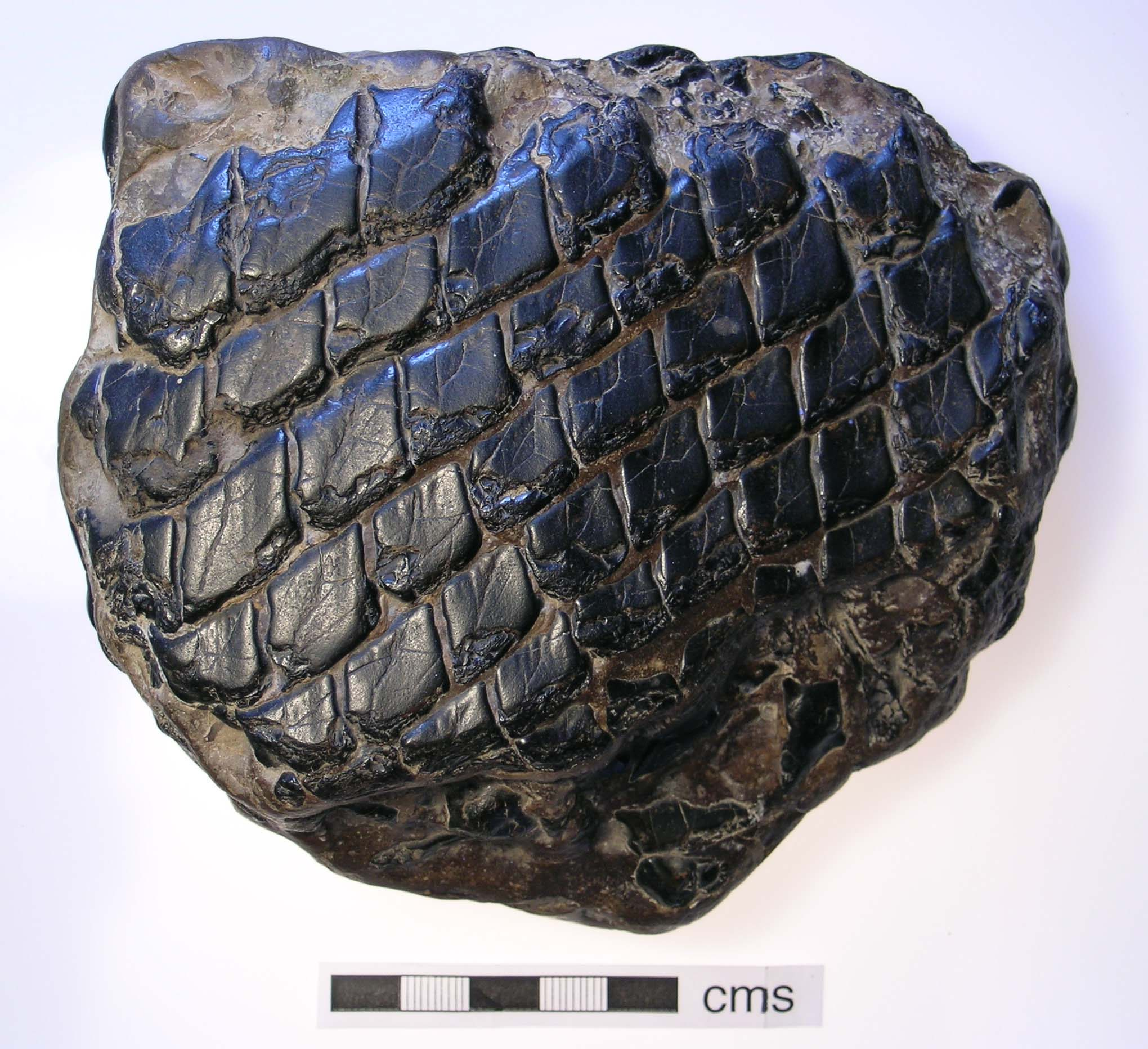
Ganoid scales on a fossilised Lepidotes, circa. 130 mya

Native Americans and people of the Caribbean used the tough ganoid scales of the alligator gar for arrow heads, breastplates, and as shielding to cover plows. In current times jewellery is made from these scales.

== Leptoid scales ==
Leptoid (bony-ridge) scales are found on higher-order bony fish, the teleosts (the more derived clade of ray-finned fishes). The outer part of these scales fan out with bony ridges while the inner part is criss-crossed with fibrous connective tissue. Leptoid scales are thinner and more translucent than other types of scales, and lack the hardened enamel-like or dentine layers. Unlike ganoid scales, further scales are added in concentric layers as the fish grows.

Leptoid scales overlap in a head-to-tail configuration, like roof tiles, making them more flexible than cosmoid and ganoid scales. This arrangement allows a smoother flow of water over the body, and reduces drag. The scales of some species exhibit bands of uneven seasonal growth called annuli (singular annulus). These bands can be used to age the fish.

Leptoid scales come in two forms: cycloid (smooth) and ctenoid (comb-like).

=== Cycloid scales ===
Cycloid (circular) scales have a smooth texture and are uniform, with a smooth outer edge or margin. They are most common on fish with soft fin rays, such as salmon and carp.

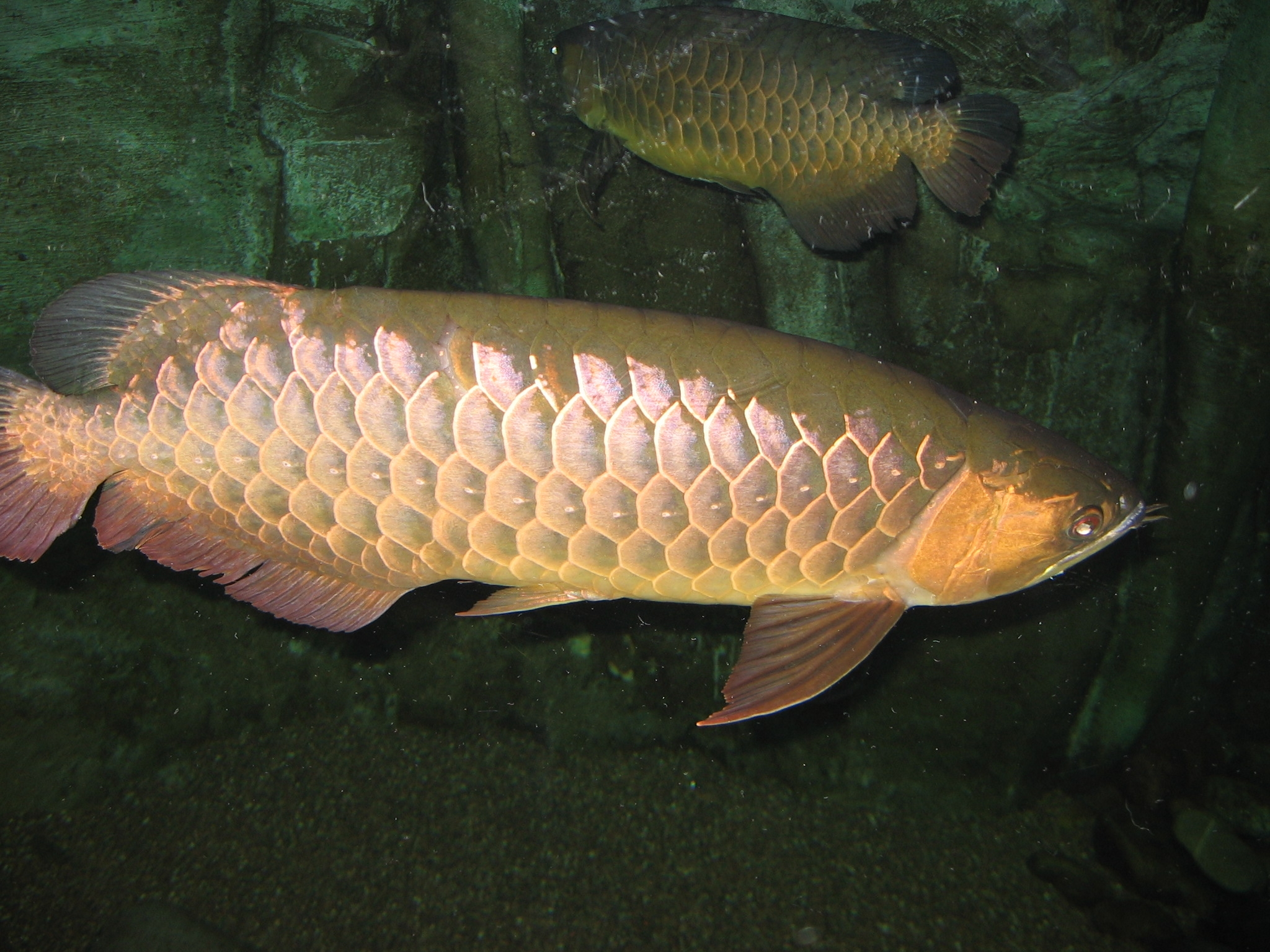

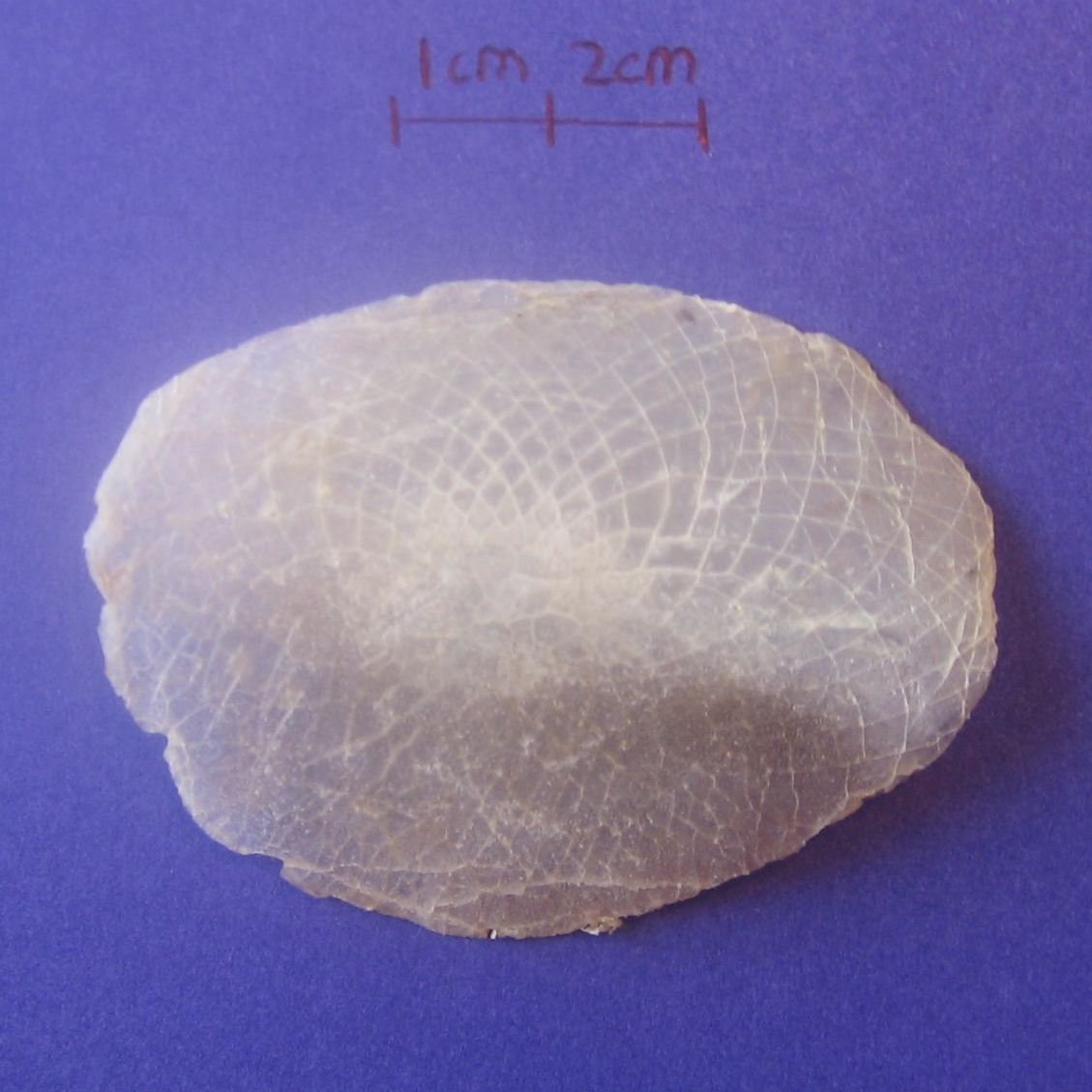

Asian arowana have large cycloid scales arranged on the fish in a mosaic of raised ribs (left). The scales themselves are covered with a delicate net pattern (right).

Cycloid (circular) scales

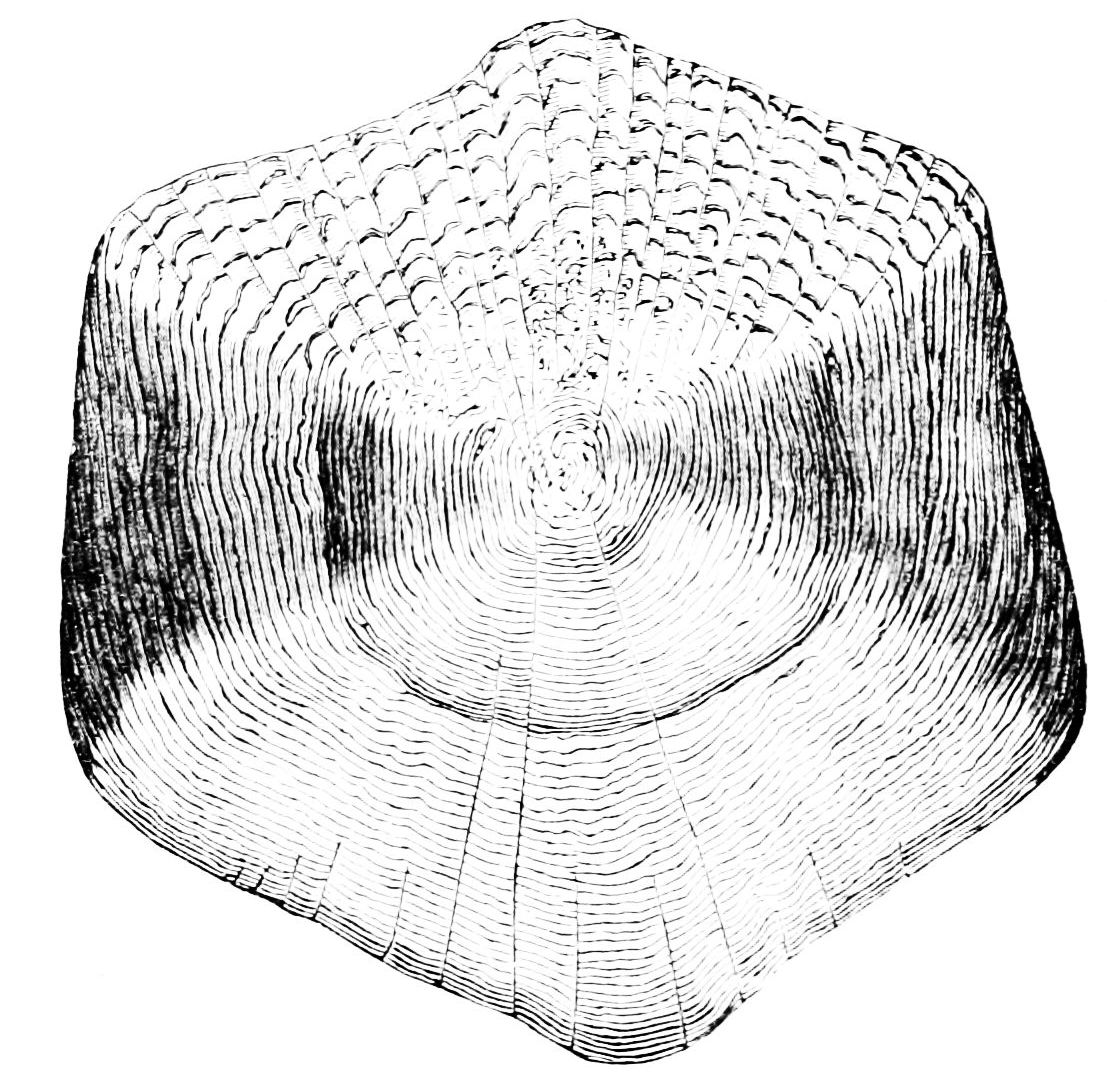
The cycloid scale of a carp has a smooth outer edge (at top of image).

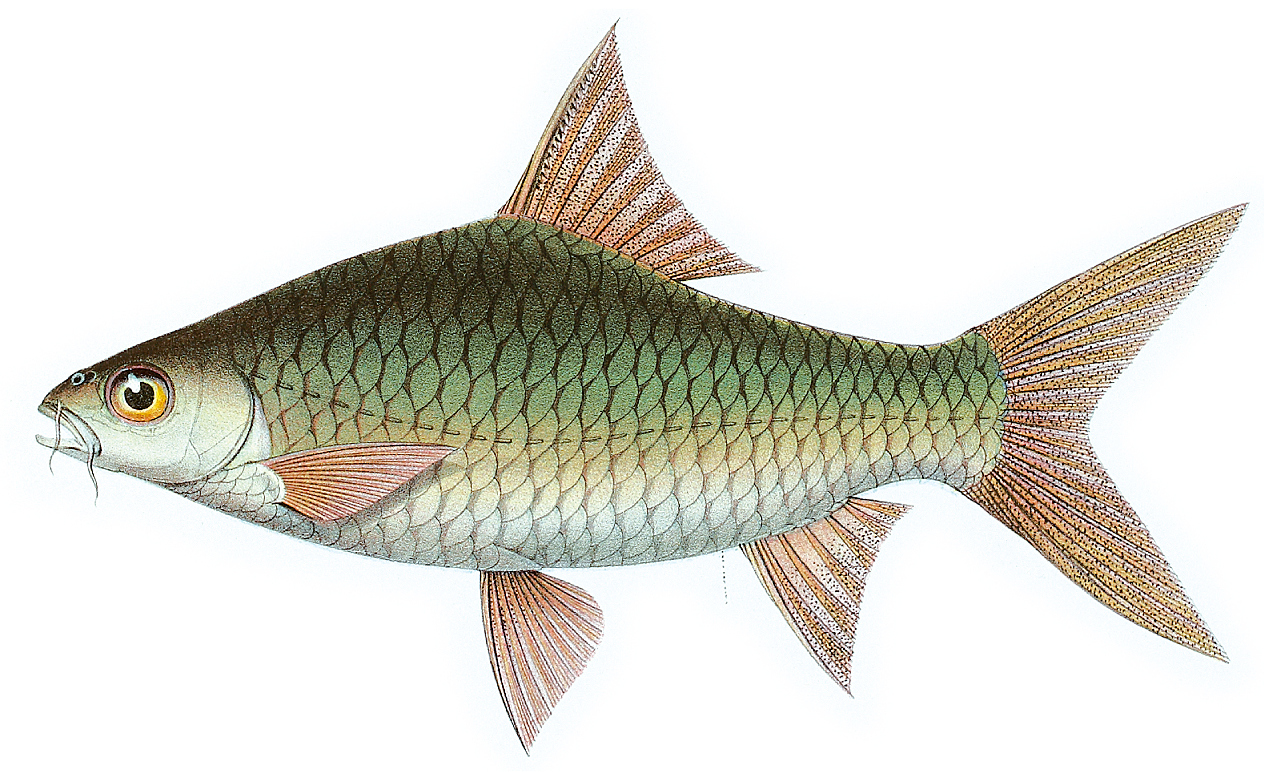
This Poropuntius huguenini is a carp-like fish with circular cycloid scales that are smooth to the touch.

Cycloid (circular) scales are usually found on carp-like or salmon-like fishes.	salmon bream loach minnow grayling bleak chub pike

=== Ctenoid scales ===
Ctenoid (toothed) scales are like cycloid scales, except they have small teeth or spinules called ctenii along their outer or posterior edges. Because of these teeth, the scales have a rough texture. They are usually found on fishes with spiny fin rays, such as the perch-like fishes. These scales contain almost no bone, being composed of a surface layer containing hydroxyapatite and calcium carbonate and a deeper layer composed mostly of collagen. The enamel of the other scale types is reduced to superficial ridges and ctenii.

Ctenoid (toothed) scales

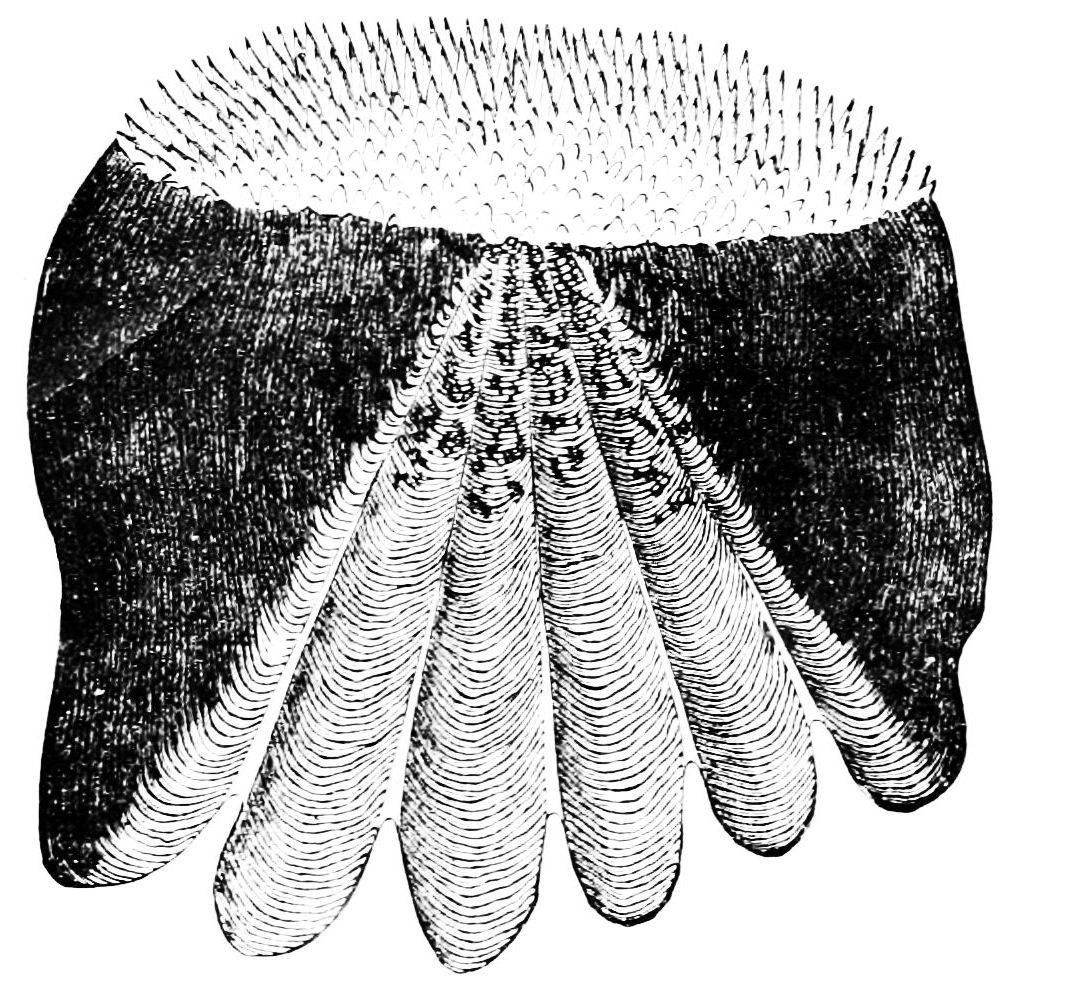
The ctenoid scale of a perch has a toothed outer edge (at top of image).

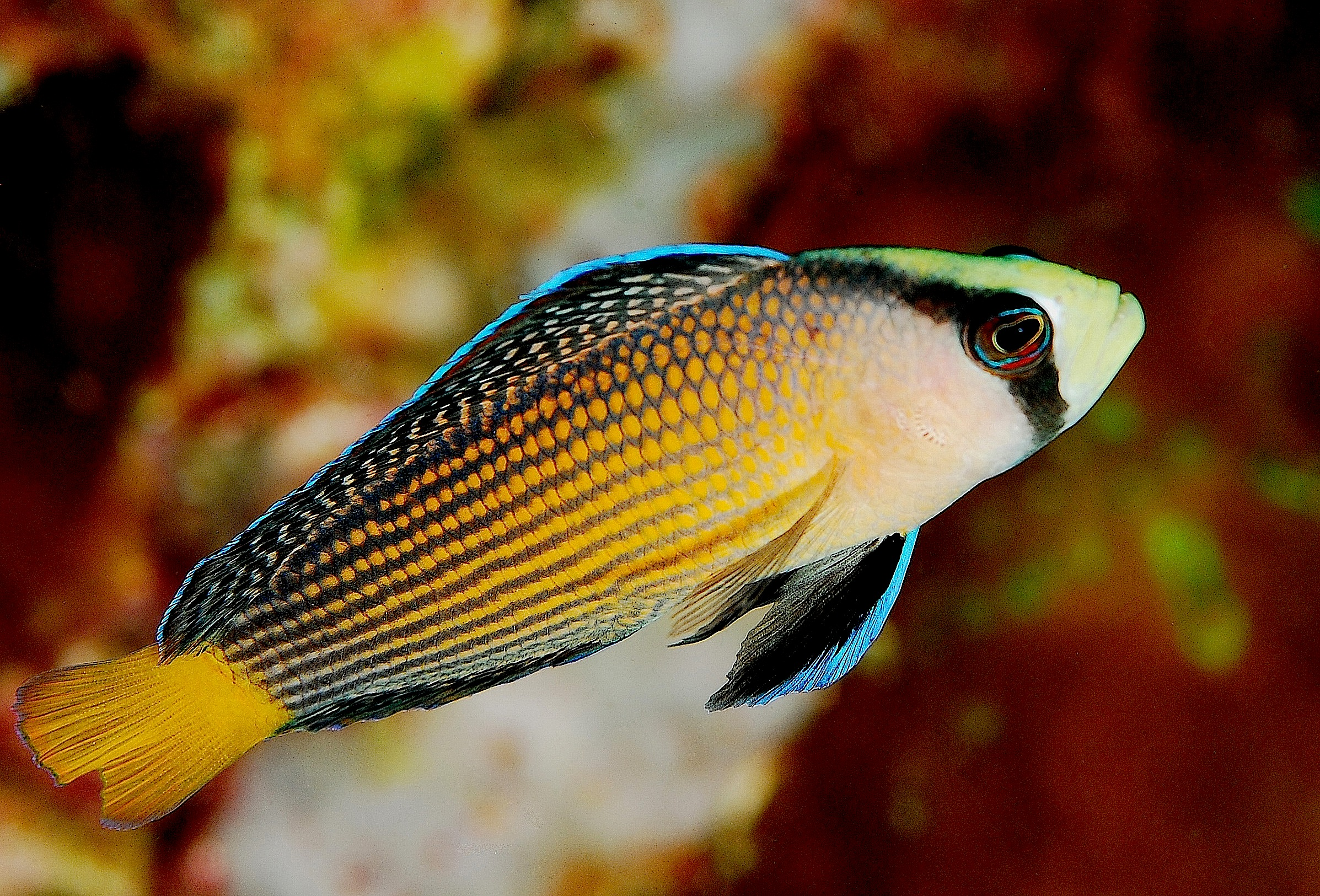
This dottyback is a perch-like fish with toothed ctenoid scales that are rough to the touch.

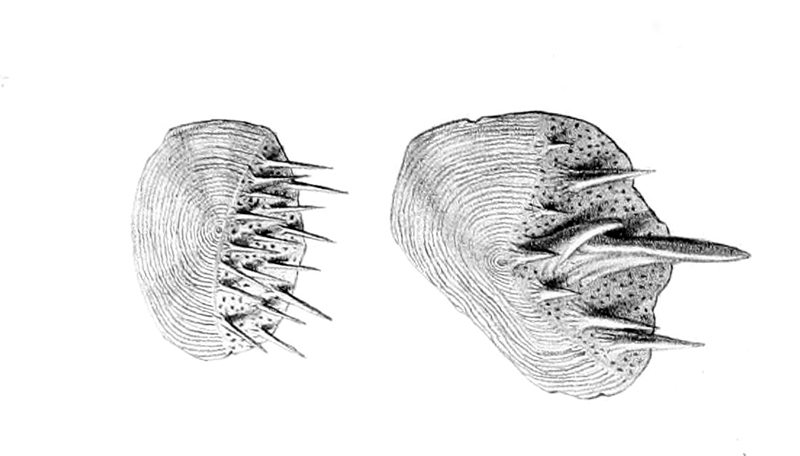

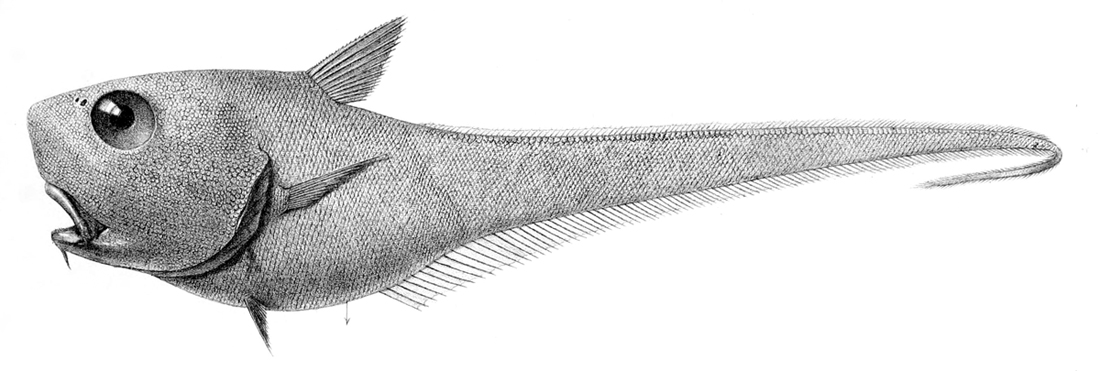

The size of the teeth on ctenoid scales can vary with position, as these scales from the rattail Cetonurus crassiceps show.

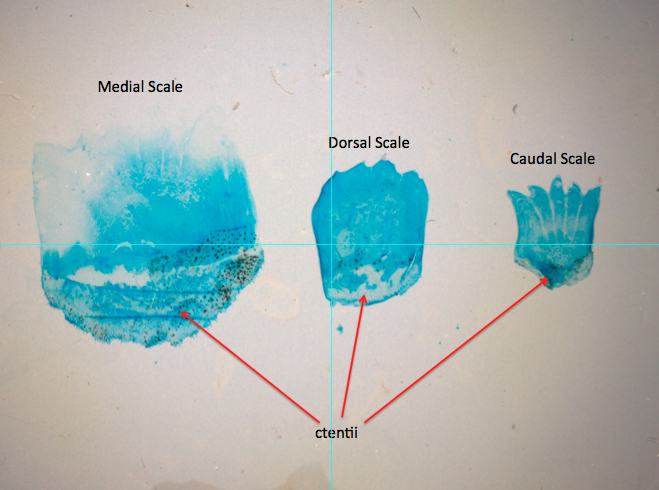
Ctenoid scales from a perch vary from the medial (middle of the fish), to dorsal (top), to caudal (tail end) scales.

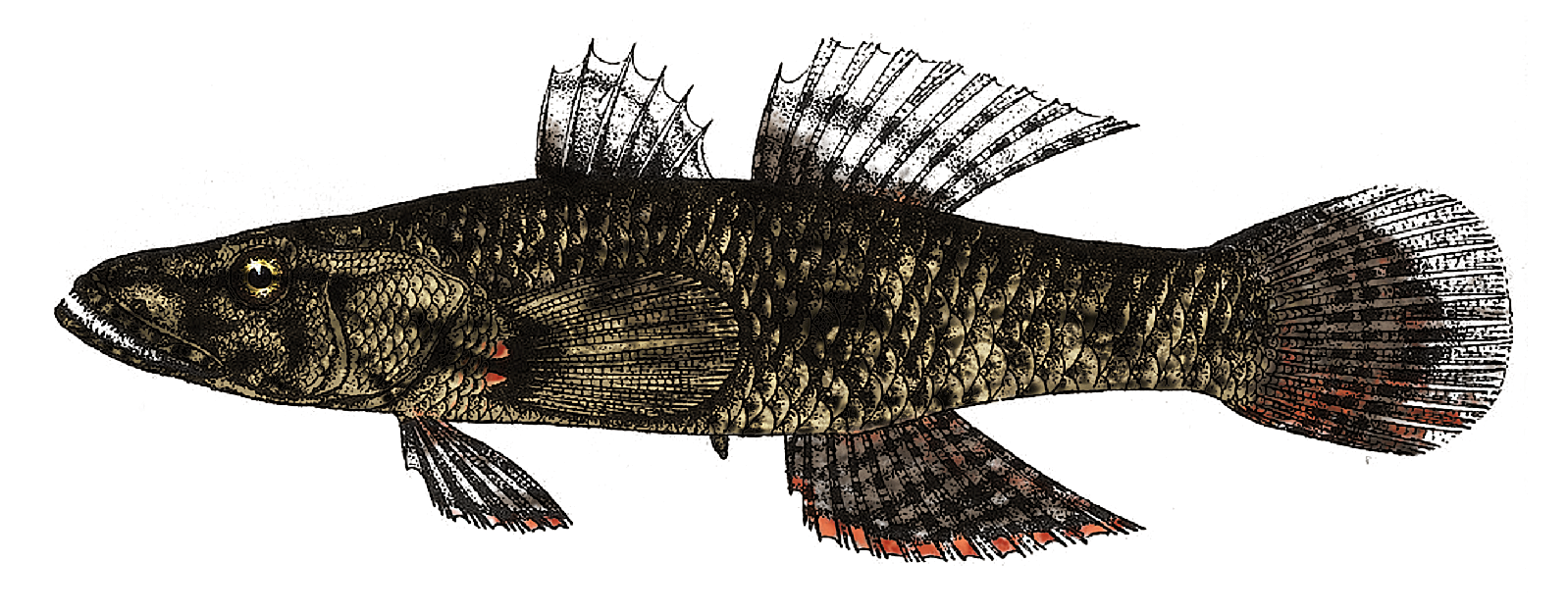
Crazy fish have cycloid scales on the belly but ctenoid scales elsewhere.

Ctenoid (toothed) scales are usually found on perch-like fishes.	goby flathead scat emperor gudgeon

Ctenoid scales, similar to other epidermal structures, originate from placodes and distinctive cellular differentiation makes them exclusive from other structures that arise from the integument. Development starts near the caudal fin, along the lateral line of the fish. The development process begins with an accumulation of fibroblasts between the epidermis and dermis. Collagen fibrils begin to organize themselves in the dermal layer, which leads to the initiation of mineralization. The circumference of the scales grows first, followed by thickness when overlapping layers mineralize together.

Ctenoid scales can be further subdivided into three types:

- Crenate scales, where the margin of the scale bears indentations and projections.
- Spinoid scales, where the scale bears spines that are continuous with the scale itself.
- True ctenoid scales, where the spines on the scale are distinct structures.

Most ray-finned fishes have ctenoid scales. Some species of flatfishes have ctenoid scales on the eyed side and cycloid scales on the blind side, while other species have ctenoid scales in males and cycloid scales in females.

=== Reflection ===
The herring's reflectors are nearly vertical for camouflage from the side.

Many teleost fish are covered with highly reflective scales which function as small mirrors and give the appearance of silvered glass. Reflection through silvering is widespread in open ocean fish, especially those that live in the top 100 metres (330 ft) of the ocean. A transparency effect can be achieved by silvering to make an animal's body highly reflective. In fish such as the herring, which lives in shallower water, the mirrors must reflect a mixture of wavelengths, and the fish accordingly has crystal stacks with a range of different spacings. A further complication for fish with bodies that are rounded in cross-section is that the mirrors would be ineffective if laid flat on the skin, as they would fail to reflect horizontally. The overall mirror effect is achieved with many small reflectors, all oriented vertically.

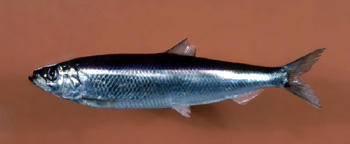
The scales of many teleost fish, like this Atlantic herring, are silvered.

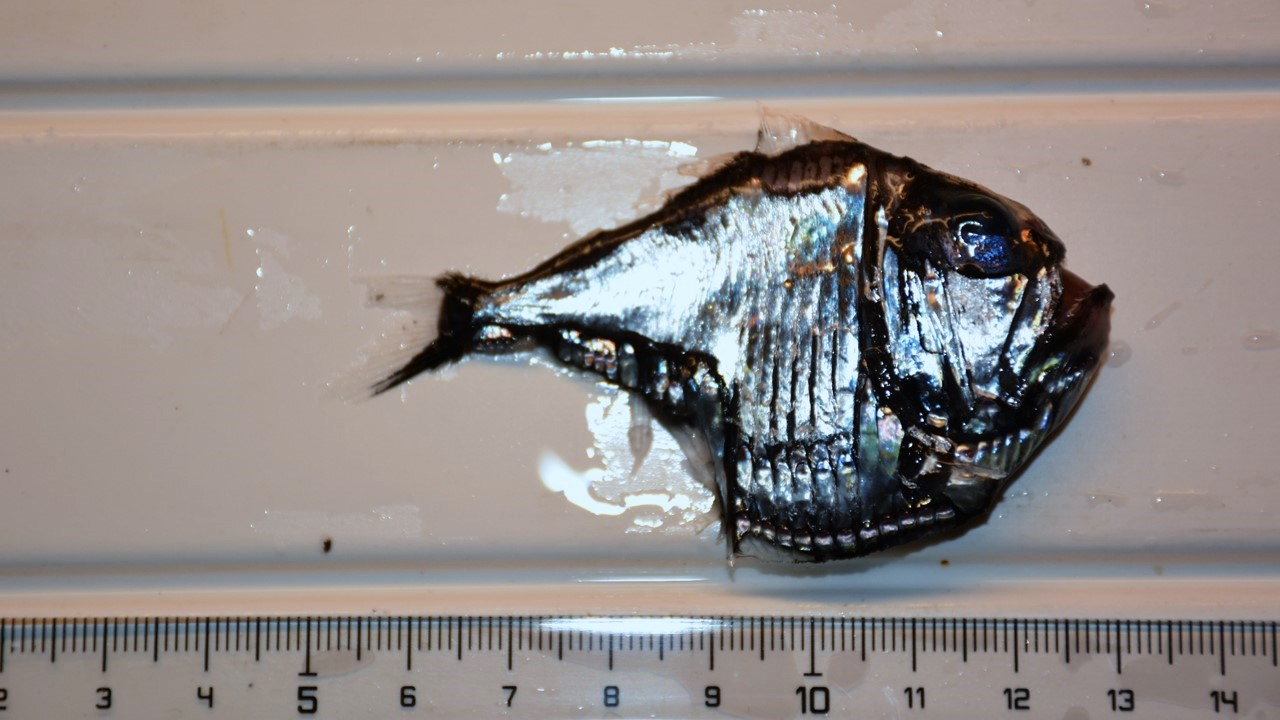
The deep sea hatchetfish has silvery scales which reflect blue light along the sides of its body.

Below 200 metres, in the mesopelagic zone of the ocean, there is only faint blue light, which can still be reflected by mirror-like scales positioned at specific angles along the sides of a fish's body. This results in the fish appearing invisible when viewed from the side, which is termed optical camouflage. The backs of these fish are typically covered in dark, non-reflective scales to match the dark water below them, and because light does not reflect off of the underbelly of these fish, they scaleless undersides covered in bioluminescent photophores to provide counter-illumination. The marine hatchetfish is extremely flattened laterally (side to side), leaving the body just millimetres thick, and the sides of the body are reflective and silvery. The reflectors consist of microscopic structures similar to those used to provide structural coloration: stacks of between 5 and 10 crystals of guanine spaced about ¼ of a wavelength apart to interfere constructively and achieve nearly 100% reflection. In the waters where hatchetfish live, only blue light with a wavelength of 500 nanometres percolates down and needs to be reflected, so mirrors 125 nanometres apart provide good camouflage. Below 1,000 metres (3,300 ft), in the bathypelagic zone, there is no sunlight, and reflective optical camouflage is totally ineffective.

Fish scales with these properties are used in some cosmetics, since they can give a shimmering effect to makeup and lipstick.

== Placoid scales ==
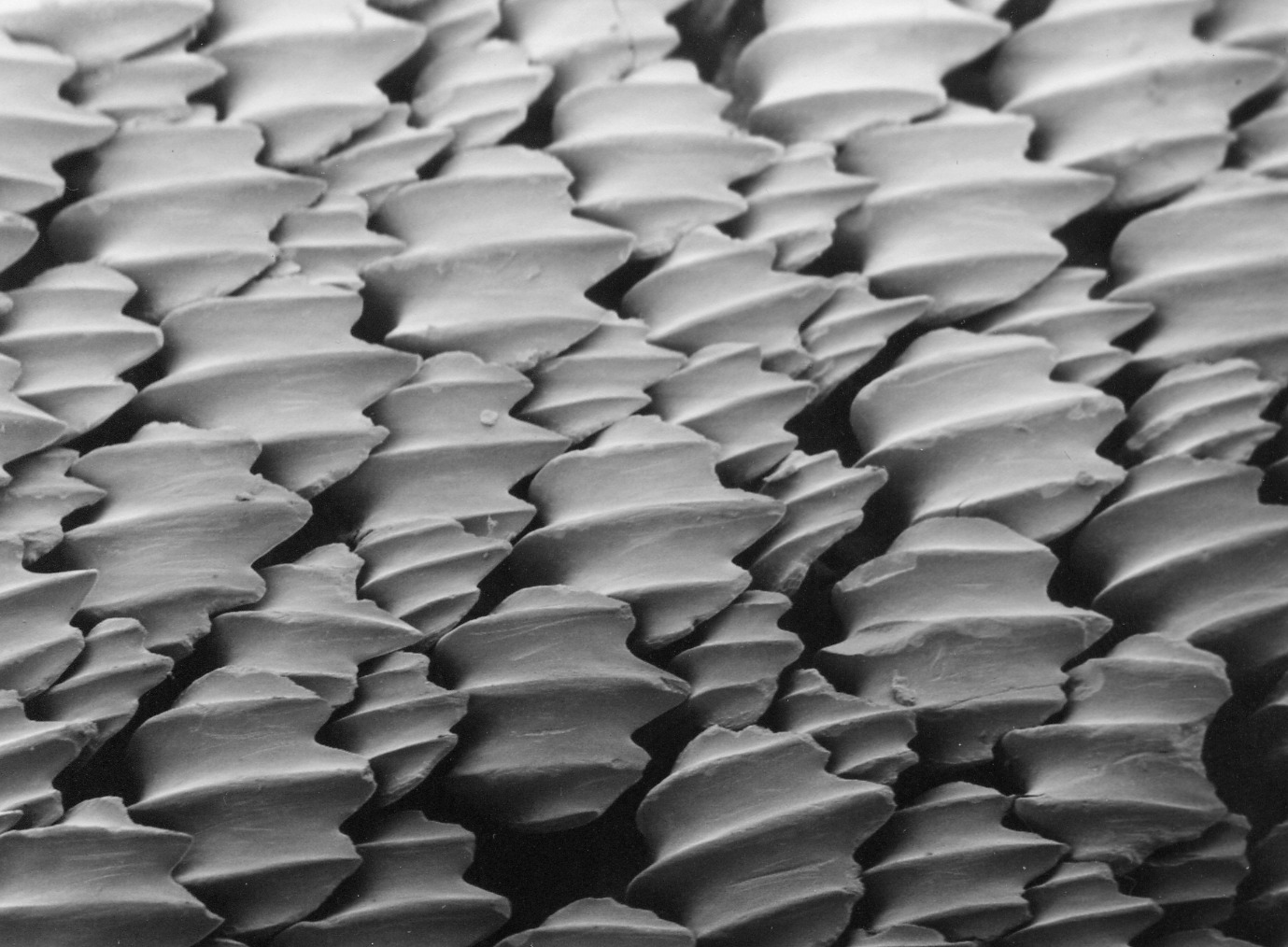
Placoid scales as viewed through an electron microscope. Also called dermal denticles, these are structurally homologous with vertebrate teeth.

Placoid (pointed, tooth-shaped) scales are found in the cartilaginous fishes: sharks, rays. They are also called dermal denticles. Placoid scales are structurally homologous with vertebrate teeth ("denticle" translates to "small tooth"), having a central pulp cavity supplied with blood vessels, surrounded by a conical layer of dentine, all of which sits on top of a rectangular basal plate that rests on the dermis. The outermost layer is composed of vitrodentine (also called enameloid), a largely inorganic enamel-like substance. Placoid scales cannot grow in size, but rather more scales are added as the fish increases in size.

Similar scales can also be found under the head of the denticle herring. The amount of scale coverage is much less in rays.

Rhomboidal scales with the properties of both placoid and ganoid scales are suspected to exist in modern jawed fish ancestors: jawless ostracoderms and then jawed placoderms.

=== Shark skin ===
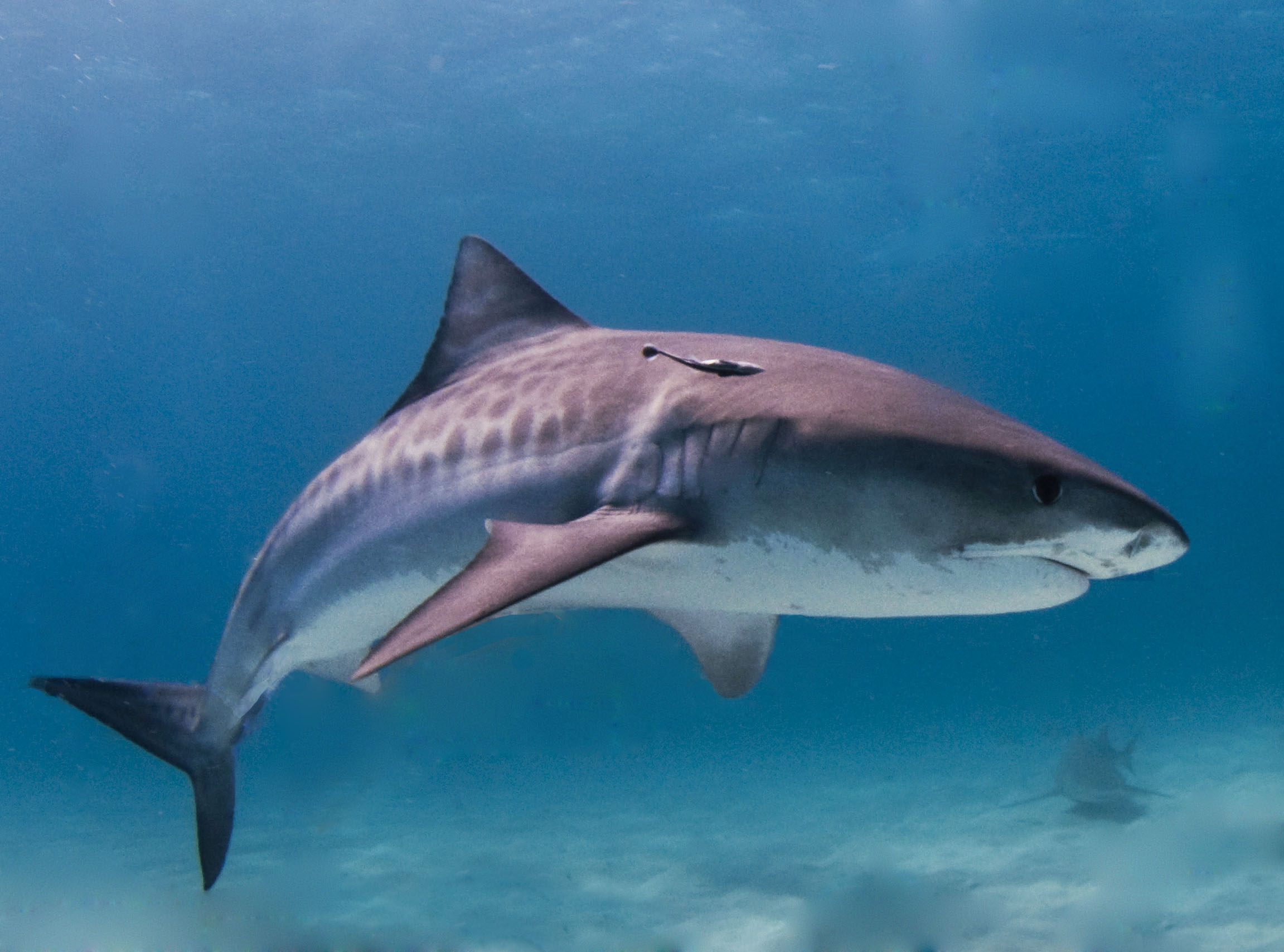
Cartilaginous fishes, like this tiger shark, have placoid scales (dermal denticles).

Shark skin is almost entirely covered by small placoid scales. The scales are supported by spines, which feel rough when stroked in a backward direction but, when flattened by the forward movement of water, create tiny vortices that reduce hydrodynamic drag and reduce turbulence, making swimming both more efficient and quieter compared to that of bony fishes. It also serves a role in anti-fouling by exhibiting the lotus effect.

All denticles are composed of an interior pulp cavity with a nervous and arterial supply rooted in the dermis to supply the denticle with mucus. Denticles contain riblet structures that protrude from the surface of the scale; under a microscope, this riblet can look like a hook or ridges coming out of the scale. The overall shape of the protrusion from the denticle is dependent on the type of shark and can be generally described with two appearances. The first is a scale in which ridges are placed laterally down the shark and parallel with the flow of the water. The second form is a smooth scale with what looks like a hooked riblet curling out of the surface aiming towards the posterior side of the shark. Both riblet shapes assist in creating a turbulent boundary layer forcing the laminar flow farther away from the sharks skin.

Unlike bony fish, sharks have a complicated dermal corset made of flexible collagenous fibers arranged as a helical network surrounding their body. The corset works as an outer skeleton, providing attachment for their swimming muscles and thus saving energy. Depending on the position of these placoid scales on the body, they can be flexible and can be passively erected, allowing them to change their angle of attack. These scales also have riblets aligned in the direction of flow, which reduce the drag force acting on the shark skin by pushing the vortex further away from the skin surface, inhibiting any high-velocity cross-stream flow.

==== Scale morphology ====
The general anatomy of the scales varies, but all of them can be divided into three parts: the crown, the neck and the base. The scale pliability is related to the size of the base of the scale. The scales with higher flexibility have a smaller base, and thus are less rigidly attached to the stratum laxum. On the crown of the fast-swimming sharks, there are a series of parallel riblets or ridges which run from an anterior to posterior direction.

Analyzing the three components of the scale, it can be concluded that the base of the denticle does not come into contact with any portion of the fluid flow. The crown and the neck of the denticles, however, play a key role and are responsible for creating the turbulent vortices and eddies found near the skin's surface. Because denticles come in so many different shapes and sizes, it can be expected that not all shapes will produce the same type of turbulent flow. During a 2018 research experiment, biomimetic samples of shark denticles with a crescent like microstructure were tested in a water tank using a traction table as a slide. The experiment showed that the surface with denticles experienced a 10% drag reduction overall versus the smooth sample. The reason for this drag reduction was that the turbulent vortices became trapped between the denticles, creating a 'cushion like' barrier against the laminar flow. This same type of experiment was performed by another research group, which implemented more variation in their biomimetic sample. The second group arrived at the same conclusion as the first. However, because their experiment contained more variation within the samples, they were able to achieve a high degree of experimental accuracy. They concluded that more practical shapes were more durable than ones with intricate ridge-lines. The practical shapes were low profile and contained trapezoidal or semi-circular trough-like cross sections, and were less effective but nonetheless reduced drag by 6 or 7%.

==== Drag reduction ====
Effects of turbulent flow on boundary layer

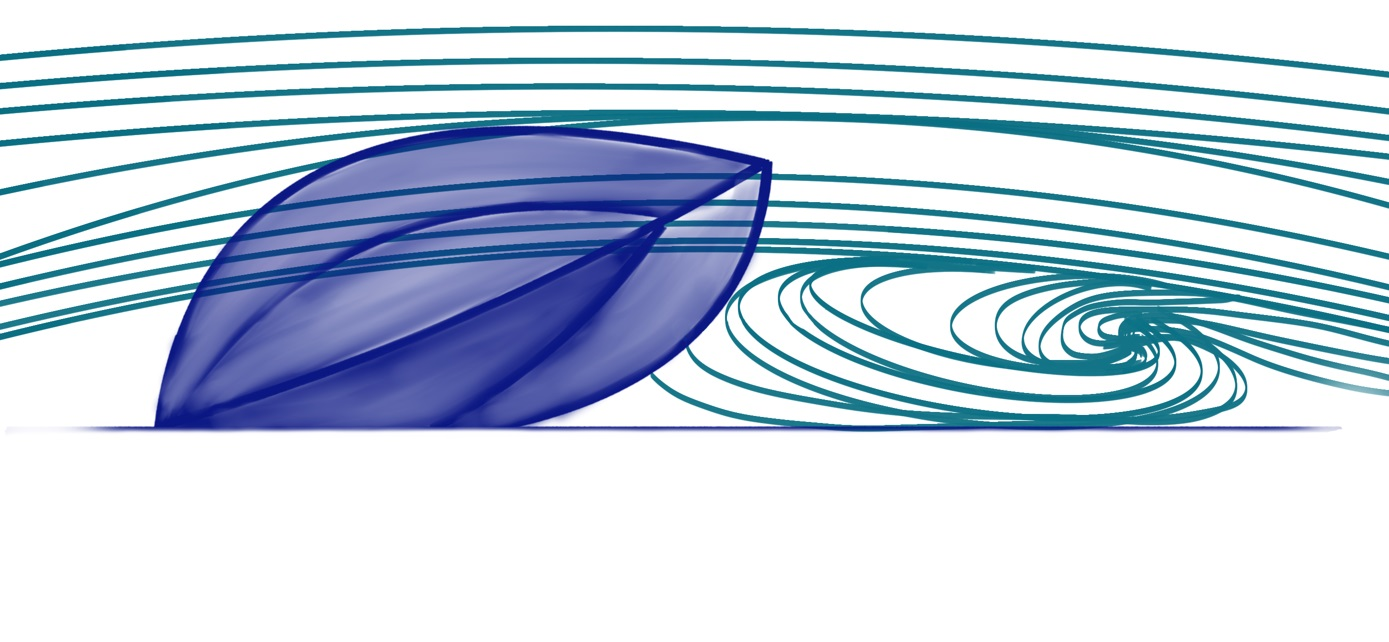
Diagram of the side profile of a shark denticle showing a vortex in the wake downstream of the denticle

Sharks decrease drag and overall cost of transport (COT) through multiple different avenues. Pressure drag is created from the pressure difference between the anterior and posterior sides of the shark due to the amount of volume that is pushed past the shark to propel itself forward. This type of drag is also directly proportional to the laminar flow. When the laminar flow increases around the fish, the pressure drag does as well. Frictional drag is a result of the interaction between the fluid against the shark's skin and can vary depending on how the boundary layer changes against the surface of the fish.

The riblets impede the cross-stream translation of the streamwise vortices in the viscous sublayer. The mechanism is complex and not yet understood fully. Basically, the riblets inhibit the vortex formation near the surface because the vortex cannot fit in the valleys formed by the riblets. This pushes the vortex further up from the surface, interacting only with the riblet tips, not causing any high-velocity flow in the valleys. Since this high-velocity flow now only interacts with the riblet-tip, which is a very small surface area, the momentum transfer which causes drag is now much lower than before, thereby effectively reducing drag. This also reduces the cross-stream velocity fluctuations, which aids in momentum transfer.

Recent research has shown that there is a pre- and post-breakdown regime in the near-wall boundary layer, where the sublayer thickens at a declining rate and then abruptly undergoes a breakdown into turbulent vortices before finally collapsing. This system is completely self-regulating and mediates the growth and decay cycle; the vortices accumulate during the growth period and are abruptly liquidated into Strouhal arrays of hairpin vortices lifting off the wall. Lifting vortices are what push the boundary layer out and away from the surface of the shark which results in reducing the overall drag experienced by the fish.

=== Technical application ===
The rough, sandpaper-like texture of shark and ray skin, coupled with its toughness, has led it to be valued as a source of rawhide leather, called shagreen. One of the many historical applications of shark shagreen was in making hand-grips for swords. The rough texture of the skin is also used in Japanese cuisine to make graters called oroshiki, by attaching pieces of shark skin to wooden boards. The small size of the scales grates the food very finely.

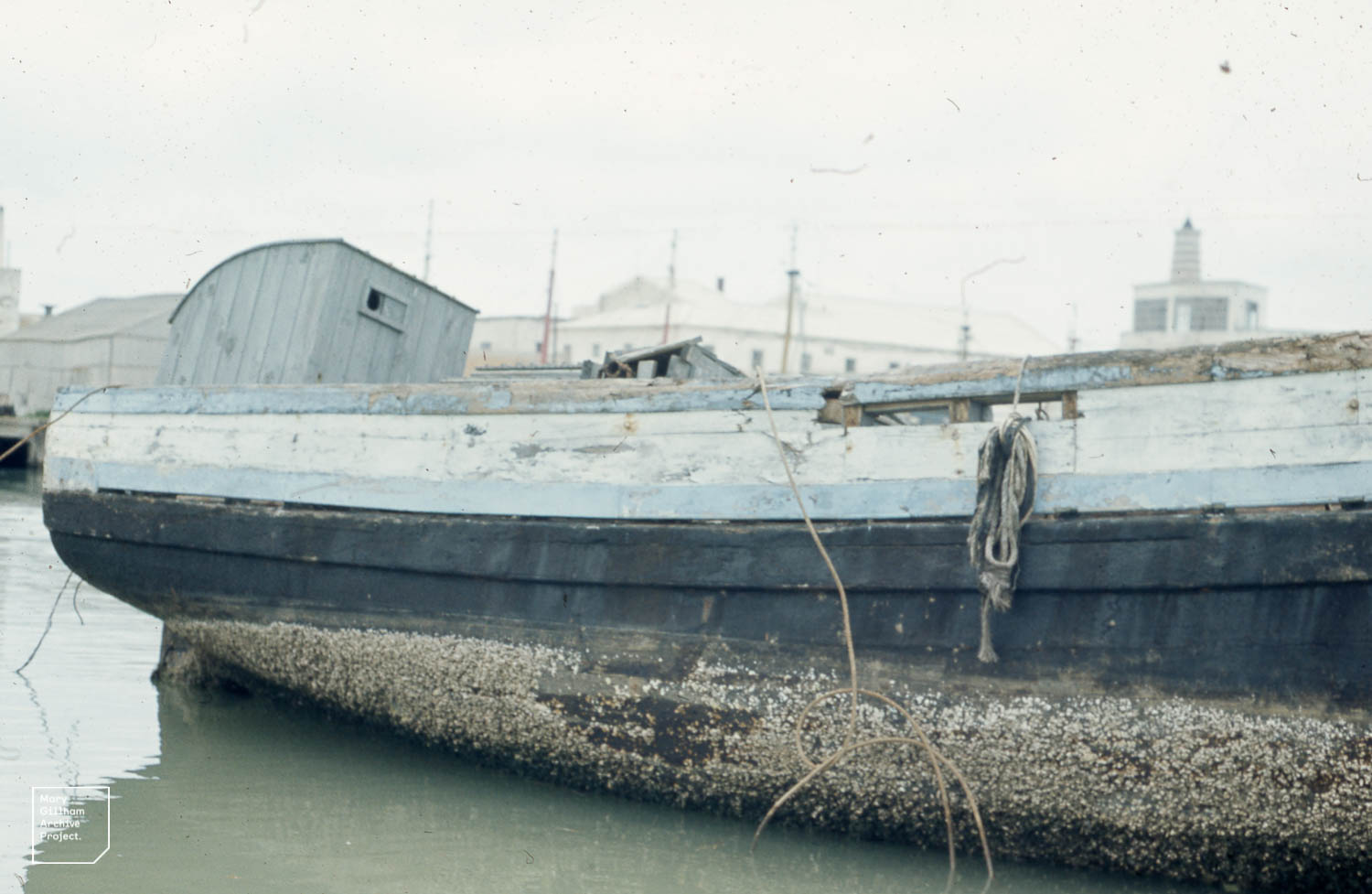
Barnacle growth on boat hull

In the marine industry, fouling is the process by which something in the water becomes encrusted with sea life such as barnacles and algae. When ships' hulls are fouled, they are much less efficient (because they are rougher), and they are expensive and time-consuming to clean. Therefore, inexpensive and environmentally safe anti-fouling surfaces are in very high demand to increase the efficiency of shipping, fishing, and naval fleets, among other applications. Dermal denticles are a promising area of research for this type of application, due to the fact that sharks are among the only fish without build up or growth on their scales. Studies by the U.S. Navy have shown that, if a biomimetic material can be engineered, it could potentially lead to fuel cost savings for military vessels of up to 45%.

There are many examples of biomimetic materials and surfaces based on the structure of aquatic organisms, including sharks. Such applications intend to enable more efficient movement through fluid mediums such as air, water, and oil.

Surfaces that mimic the skin of sharks have also been used in order to keep microorganisms and algae from coating the hulls of submarines and ships. One variety is traded as "sharklet".

A lot of the new methods for replicating shark skin involve the use of polydimethylsiloxane (PDMS) for creating a mold. Usually, the process involves taking a flat piece of shark skin, covering it with the PDMS to form a mold and pouring PDMS into that mold again to get a shark skin replica. This method has been used to create a biomimetic surface which has superhydrophobic properties, exhibiting the lotus effect. One study found that these biomimetic surfaces reduced drag by up to 9%, while, with flapping motion, drag reduction reached 12.3%.

Denticles also provide drag reduction on objects where the main form of drag is caused by turbulent flow at the surface. A large portion of the total drag on long objects with relatively flat sides usually comes from turbulence at the wall, so riblets will have an appreciable effect. Along with marine applications, the aerospace industry can benefit greatly from these biomimetic designs. Other applications include pipes, where scoring the insides to a riblet-like roughness leads to a 5% drag reduction, and competitive swimwear, where a few percent reduction is claimed.

Parametric modeling has been done on shark denticles with a wide range of design variations, such as low and high-profile vortex generators. Through this method, the most thorough characterization has been completed for symmetrical two-dimensional riblets with sawtooth, scalloped and blade cross sections. These biomimetic models were designed and analyzed to see the effects of applying the denticle-like structures to the wings of various airplanes. During the simulation, it was noted that the sample altered how the low and high angles of attack reacted. Both the geometry of the denticles and their arrangement have a profound effect on the aerodynamic response of the aerofoils. Out of both the low and high-profile samples tested, the low-profile vortex generators outperformed the current smooth wing structures by 323%. This increase in performance is due to a separation bubble in the denticle's wake and stream-wise vortices that replenish momentum lost in the boundary layer due to skin friction.

== Scutes ==
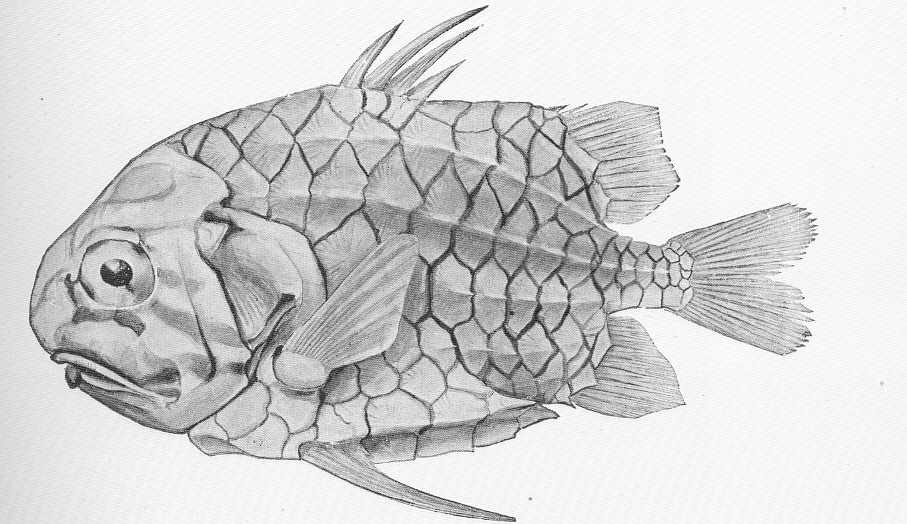
Pineconefish are covered in scutes.

Scutes are similar to scales and serve the same function. Unlike the scales of fish, which are formed from the epidermis, scutes are formed in the lower vascular layer of the skin and the epidermal element is only the top surface. Forming in the living dermis, the scutes produce a horny outer layer that is superficially similar to that of scales.

Scute comes from Latin for shield, and can take the form of:

- an external shield-like bony plate, or
- a modified, thickened scale that often is keeled or spiny, or
- a projecting, modified (rough and strongly ridged) scale, usually associated with the lateral line, or on the caudal peduncle forming caudal keels, or along the ventral profile.

Some fish, such as pineconefish, are completely or partially covered in scutes. River herrings and threadfins have an abdominal row of scutes, which are scales with raised, sharp points that are used for protection. Some jacks have a row of scutes following the lateral line on either side.

== Scale development ==
Scales typically appear late in the development of fish. In the case of zebrafish, it takes 30 days after fertilization before the different layers needed to start forming the scales have differentiated and become organized. For this, it is necessary that consolidation of the mesenchyme occurs, then morphogenesis is induced, and finally the process of differentiation or late metamorphosis occurs.

- Mesenchyme consolidation: The consolidation or structuring of the mesenchyme originates during the development of the dermis. This process depends on whether the fish is cartilaginous or bony. For cartilaginous fish, the structuring originates through the formation of two layers. The first is superficial and wide and the second is thin and compact. These two layers are separated by mesenchymal cells. Bony fish generate an acellular substrate organized by perpendicularly by collagen fibers. Subsequently, for both fish, the fibroblasts elongate. These penetrate the compact layer of the mesenchyme, which consolidates prior to the formation of the scale, in order to initiate the dermal plate.
- Morphogenesis induction: The morphogenesis is due to the formation of the epidermal papilla, which is generated by joining the epidermis and dermis through a process of invagination. Morphogenesis begins at the time when fibroblasts are relocated to the upper part of the compact mesenchyme. Throughout this process, the basal cells of the epithelium form a delimiting layer, which is located in the upper part of the mesenchyme. Subsequently, these cells will differentiate in the area where the scale primordium will arise.
- Differentiation or late metamorphosis: This differentiation is generated by two different forms according to the type of scale being formed. The formation of elasmoid scales (cycloids and ctenoids) occurs through the formation of a space between the matrix of the epidermal papilla. This space contains collagen fibers. Around this space, elasmoblasts differentiate and are responsible for generating the necessary material for the formation of the scale. Subsequently, matrix mineralization occurs, allowing the scale to acquire the rigid characteristic that identifies them.

Unlike elasmoid scales, ganoid scales are composed of mineralized and non-mineralized collagen in different regions. The formation of these occurs through the entry of the surface cells of the mesenchyme into the matrix; the latter is composed of collagen fibers and is located around the vascular capillaries, thus giving rise to vascular cavities. At this point, elasmoblasts are replaced by osteoblasts, thus forming bone. The patches of the matrix of the scale that are not ossified are composed of compacted collagen that allow it to maintain the union with the mesenchyme. This are known as Sharpey fibers.

One of the genes that regulate the development of scale formation in fish is the sonic hedgehog (shh) gene which, by means of the (shh) protein, involved in organogenesis and the process of cellular communication, enable the formation of the scales. The apolipoprotein E (ApoE), which allows the transport and metabolism of triglycerides and cholesterol, has an interaction with shh, because ApoE provides cholesterol to the shh signaling pathway. It has been shown that, during the process of cell differentiation and interaction, the level of ApoE transcription is high, which has led to the conclusion that this protein is important for the late development of scales.

== Modified scales ==
Lateral line

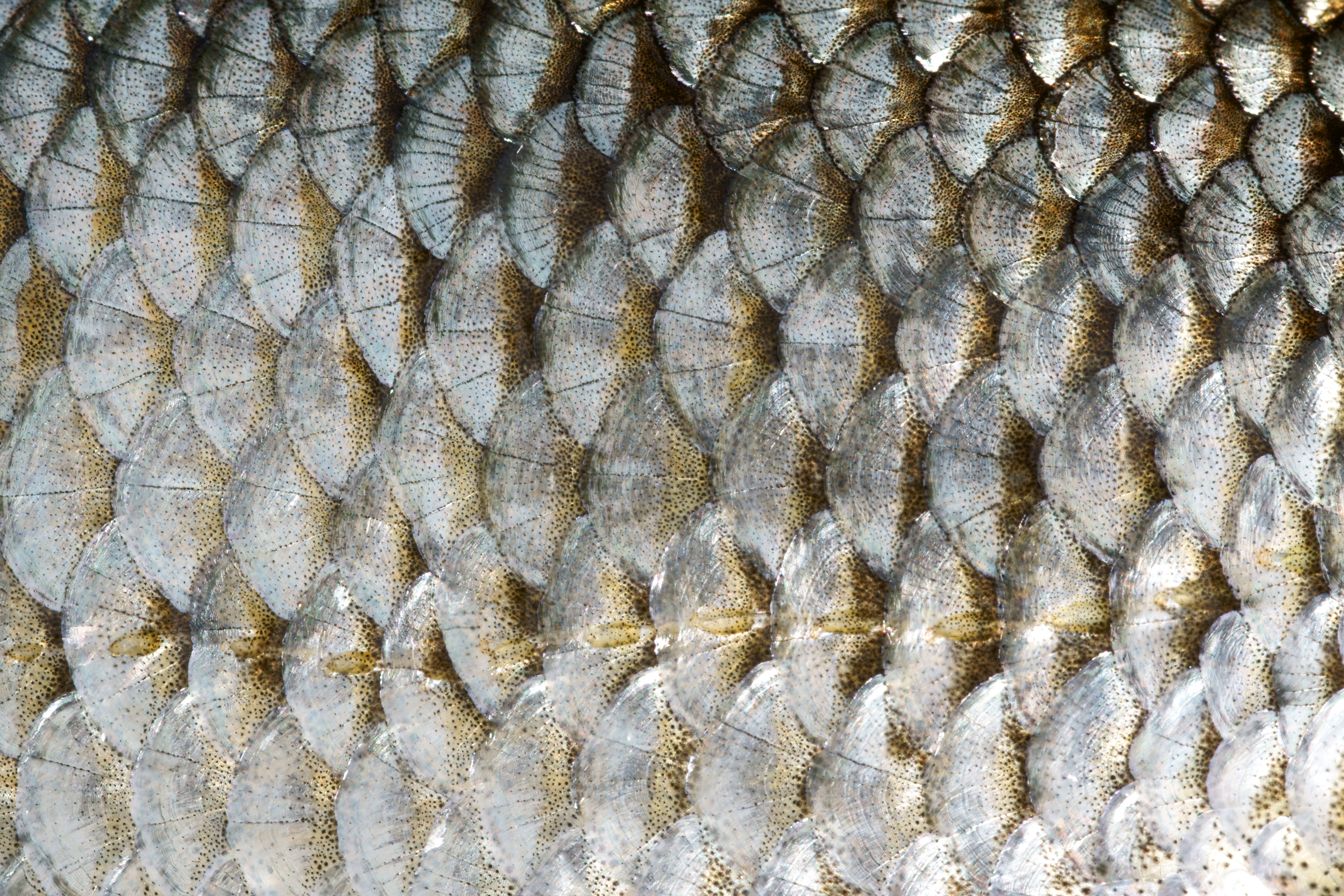
Cycloid scales of a common roach. Modified scales along the lateral line are visible in the lower half.

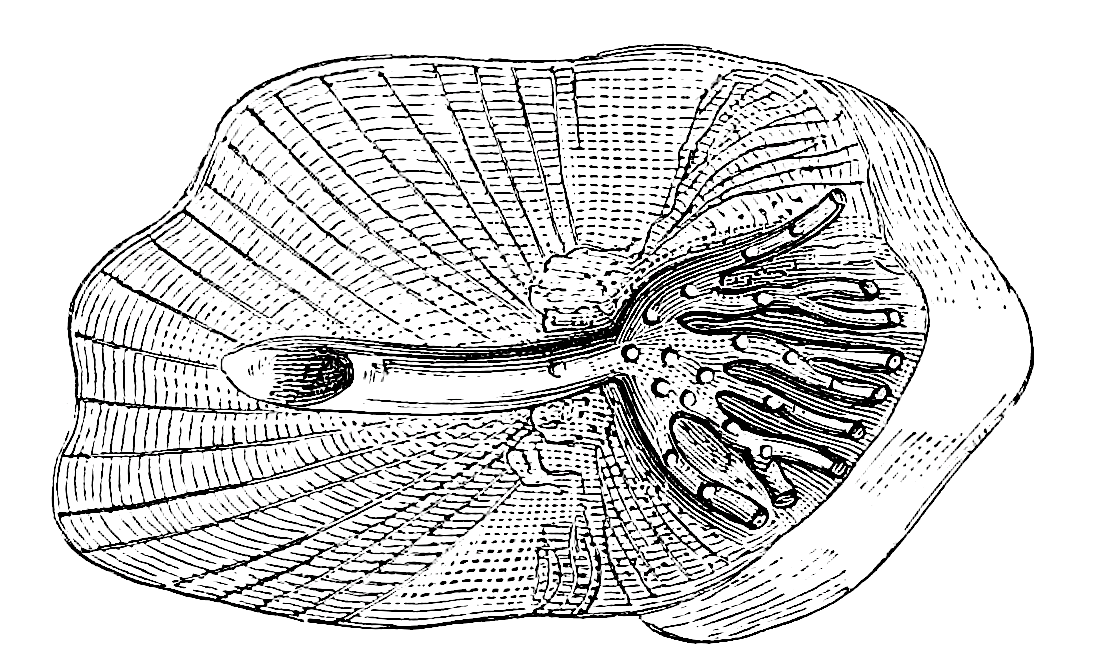
Closeup of a modified cycloid scale from the lateral line of a wrasse

Surgeonfish
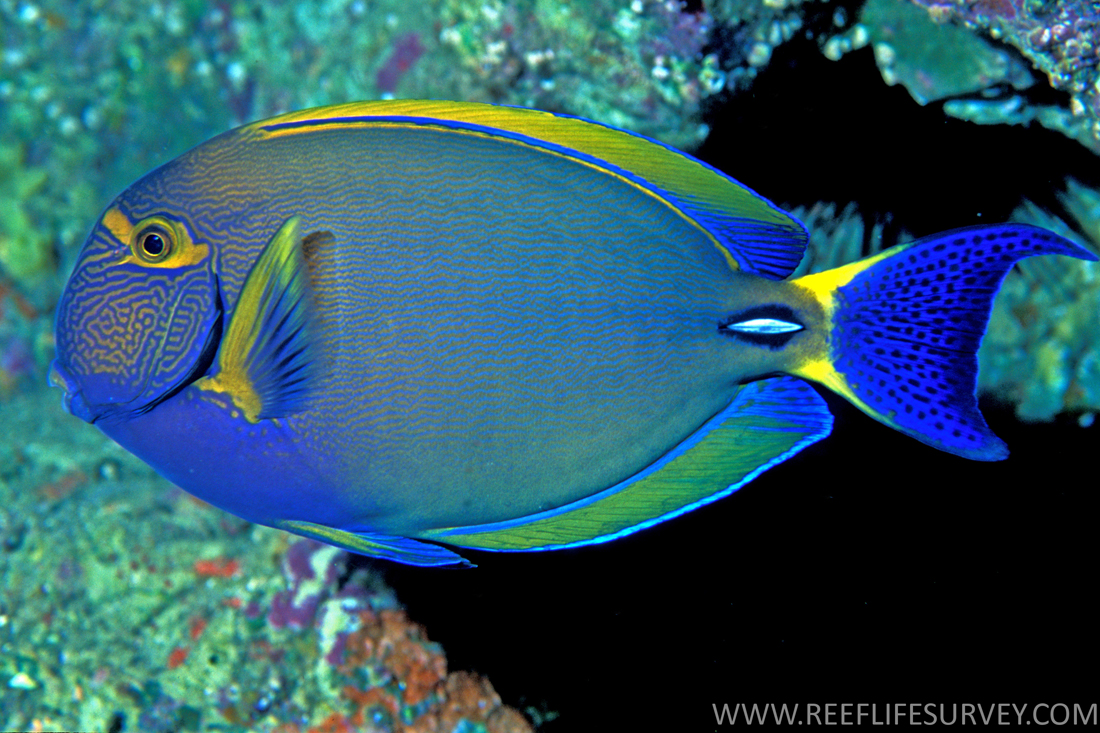
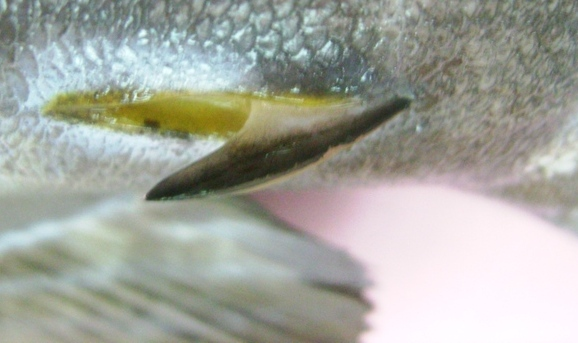
Surgeonfish (left) have a sharp, scalpel-like modified scale on either side just before the tail. Closeup (right).

Different groups of fish have evolved a number of modified scales to serve various functions:

- Almost all fishes have a lateral line, a system of mechanoreceptors that detect water movements. In bony fishes, the scales along the lateral line have central pores that allow water to contact the sensory cells.
- The dorsal fin spines of dogfish sharks and chimaeras, the stinging tail spines of stingrays, and the "saw" teeth of sawfishes and sawsharks are fused and modified placoid scales.
- Surgeonfish have a scalpel-like blade, which is a modified scale, on either side of the caudal peduncle.
- Some herrings, anchovies, and halfbeaks have deciduous scales, which are easily shed and aid in escaping predators.
- Male Percina darters have a row of enlarged caducous scales between the pelvic fins and the anus.
- Porcupine fishes have scales modified into large external spines.
- By contrast, pufferfish have thinner, more hidden spines than porcupine fish, which become visible only when the fish puffs up. Unlike the porcupine fish, these spines are not modified scales, but develop under the control of the same network of genes that produce feathers and hairs in other vertebrates.
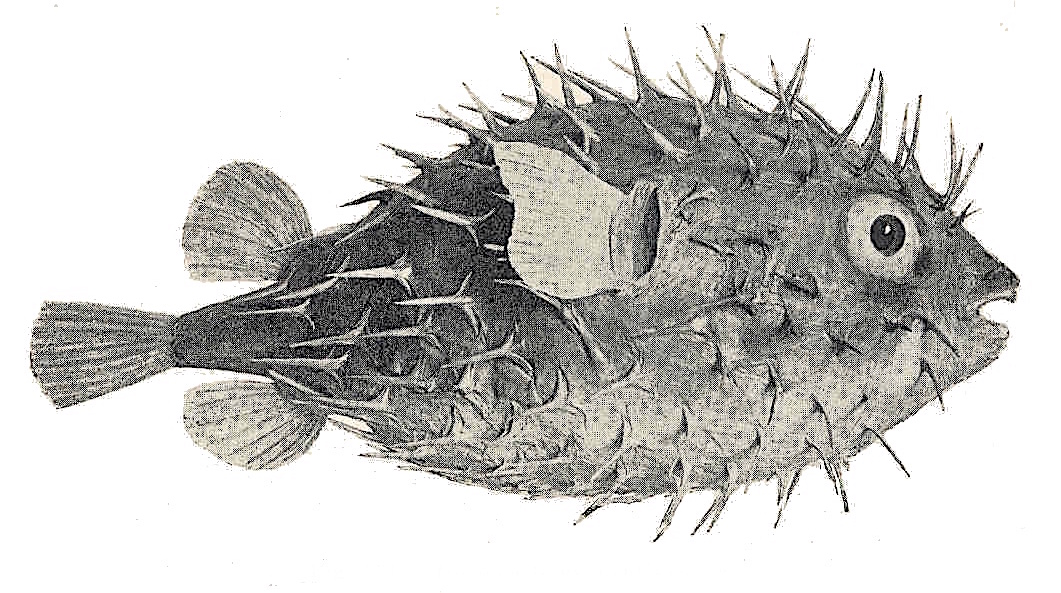
Porcupine fish have scales modified into spines.

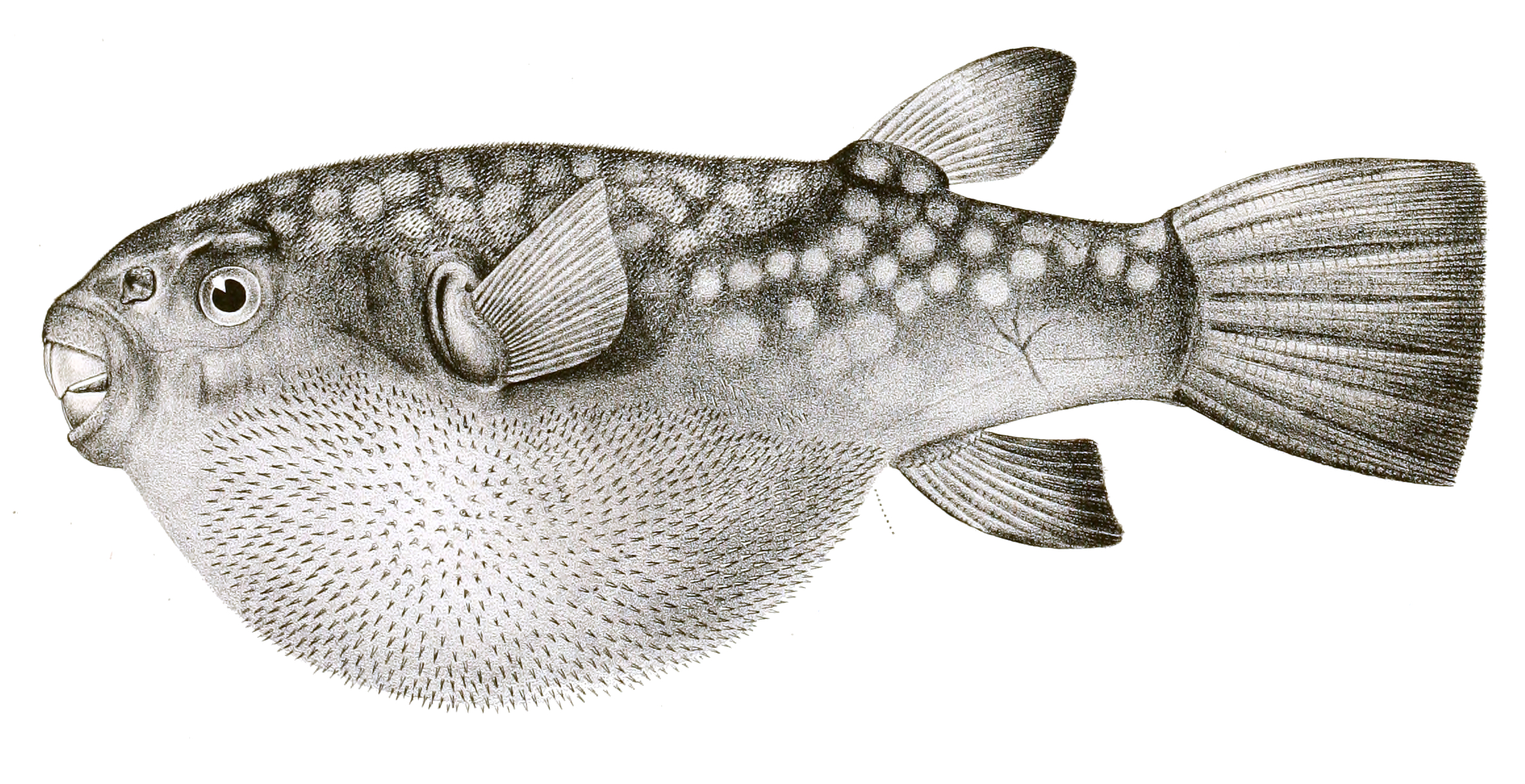
Pufferfish spines are not modified scales but are developed by an independent gene network.

== Fish without scales ==
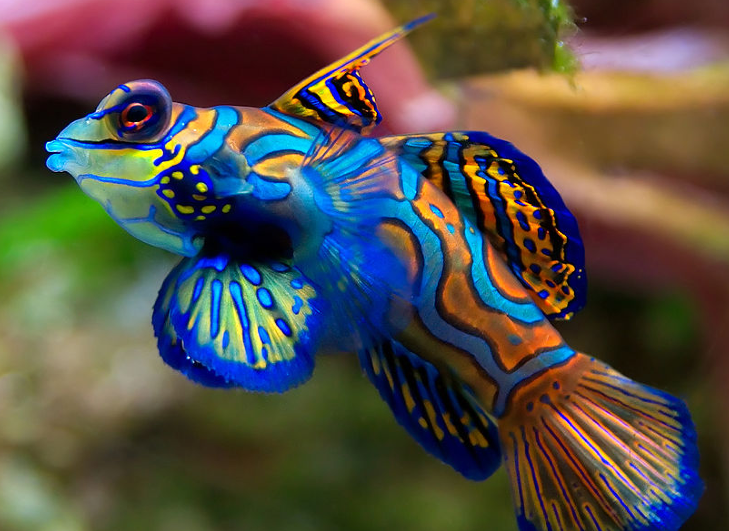
Mandarinfish lack scales and protect themselves with a layer of smelly and bitter slime.

Fish without scales usually evolve alternatives to the protection scales can provide, such as tough leathery skin or bony plates.

- Jawless fish (lampreys and hagfishes) have smooth skin without scales and without dermal bone. Lampreys get some protection from a tough leathery skin, while hagfish exude copious quantities of slime or mucus if they are threatened. They can tie themselves in an overhand knot, scraping off the slime as they go and freeing themselves from a predator.
- Most eels are scaleless, though some species are covered with tiny smooth cycloid scales.
- Most catfish lack scales, though several families have body armour in the form of dermal plates or some sort of scute.
- Mandarinfish lack scales and have a layer of smelly and bitter slime which blocks out disease and probably discourages predators, implying their bright coloration is aposematic.
- Anglerfish have loose, thin skin often covered with fine forked dermal prickles or tubercles, but they do not have regular scales. They rely on camouflage to avoid the attention of predators, while their loose skin makes it difficult for predators to grab them.

Many groups of bony fishes, including pipefish, seahorses, boxfish, poachers, and several families of sticklebacks, have developed external bony plates, structurally resembling placoid scales, as protective armour against predators.

- Seahorses lack scales but have thin skin stretched over a bony plate armour arranged in rings through the length of their bodies.
- In boxfish, the plates fuse together to form a rigid shell or exoskeleton enclosing the entire body. These bony plates are not modified scales but skin that has been ossified. Because of this heavy armour, boxfish are limited to slow movements, but few other fish are able to eat the adults.

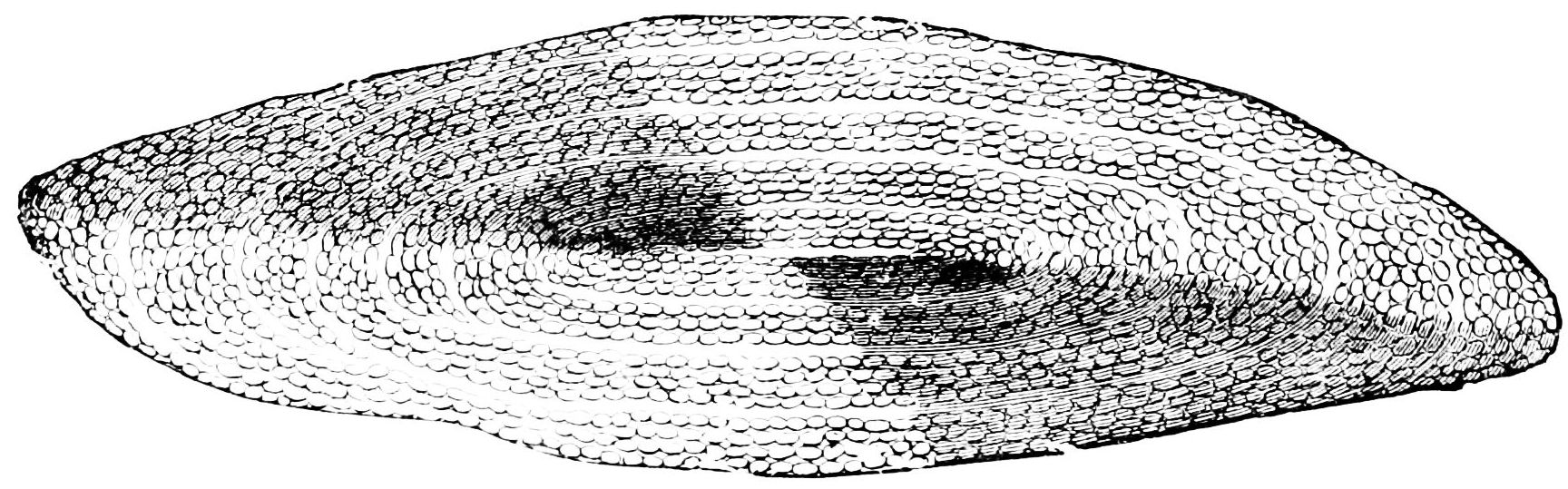

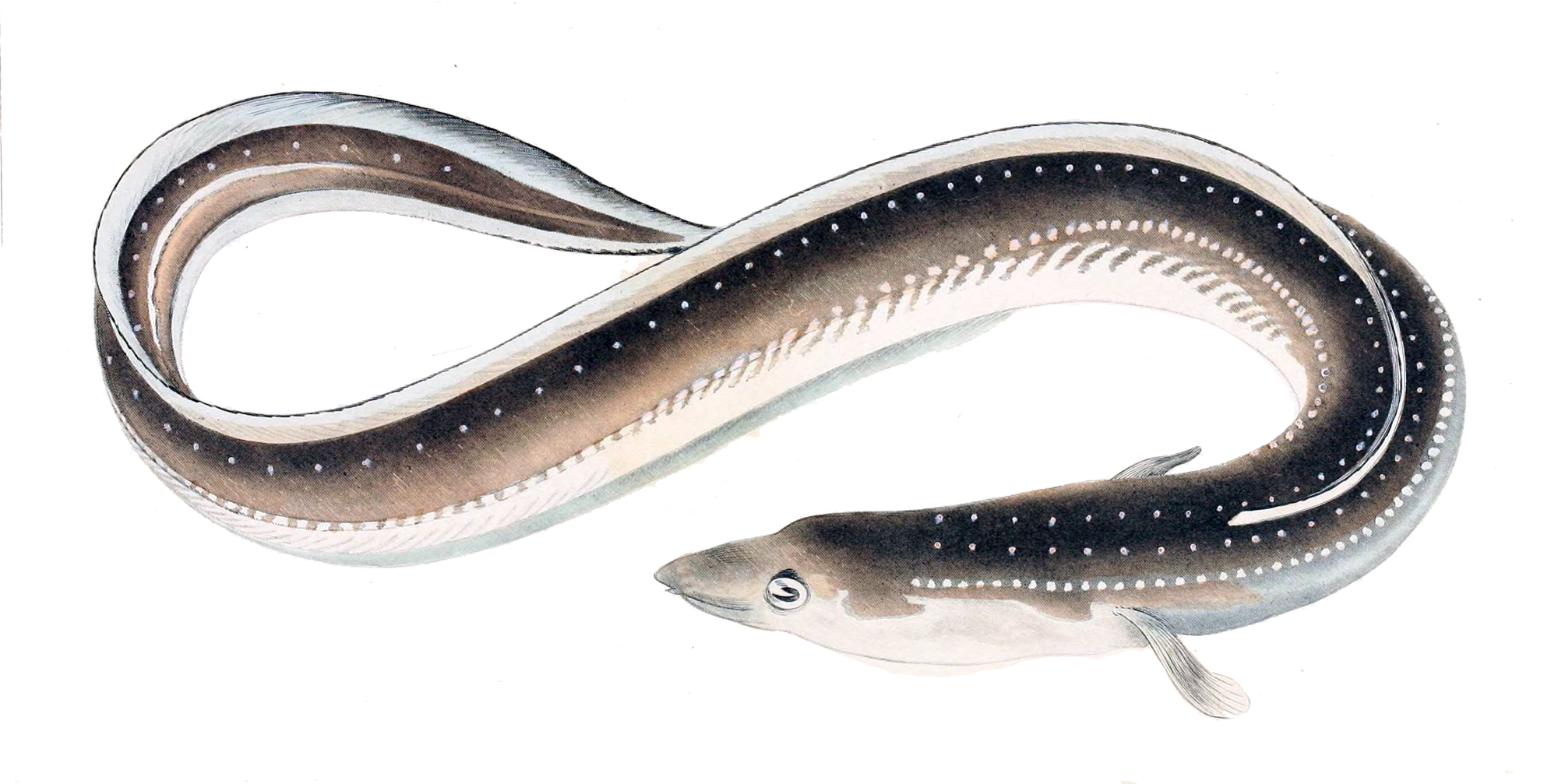

Eels seem scaleless, but some species are covered with tiny smooth cycloid scales.

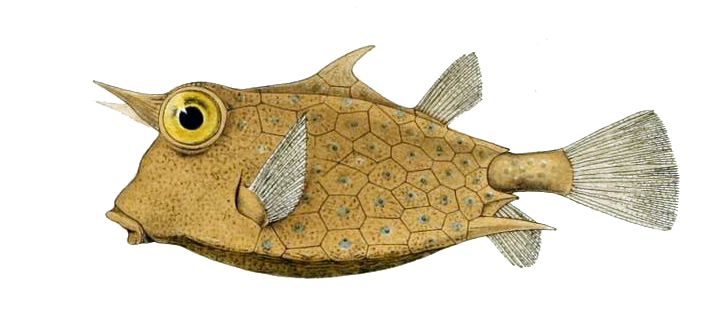
Boxfish have plates of ossified skin fused together to form a rigid shell.

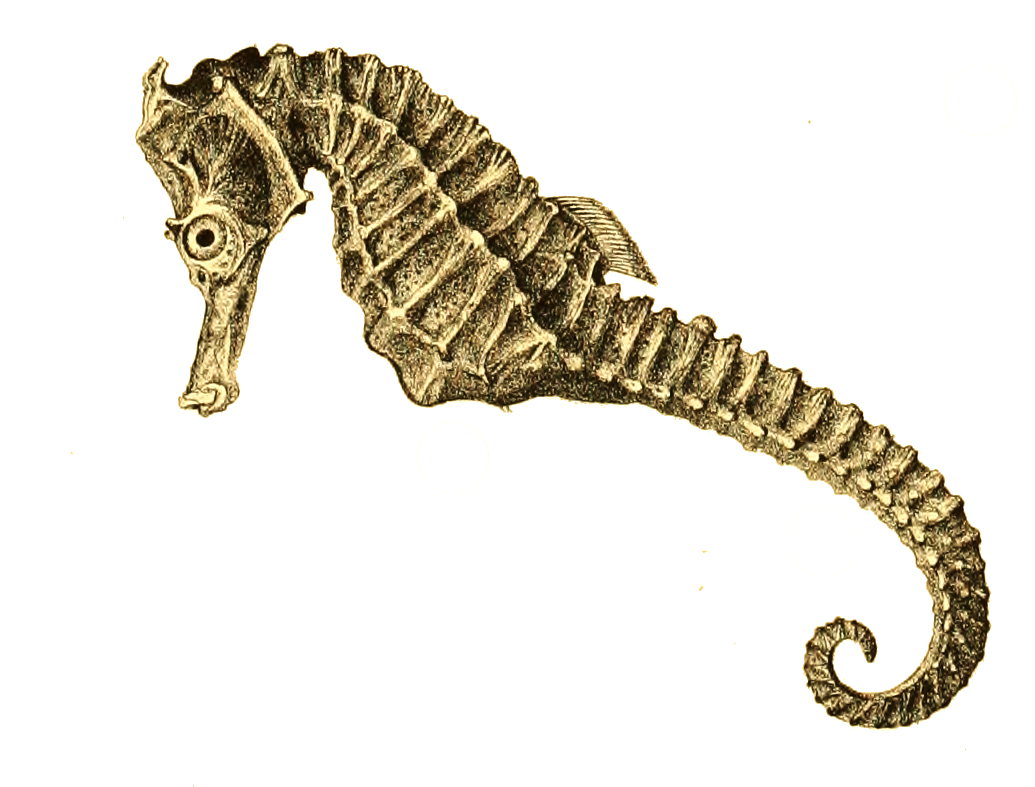
Seahorses have thin skin stretched over bony plates arranged in rings.

Some fish, such as hoki and swordfish, are born with scales but shed them as they grow.

Filefish have rough, non-overlapping scales, with small spikes, which is why they are called filefish. Some filefish appear scaleless because their scales are so small.

Prominent scaling appears on tuna only along the lateral line and in the corselet, a protective band of thickened and enlarged scales in the shoulder region. Over most of their body, tuna have scales so small that, to casual inspection, they seems scaleless.

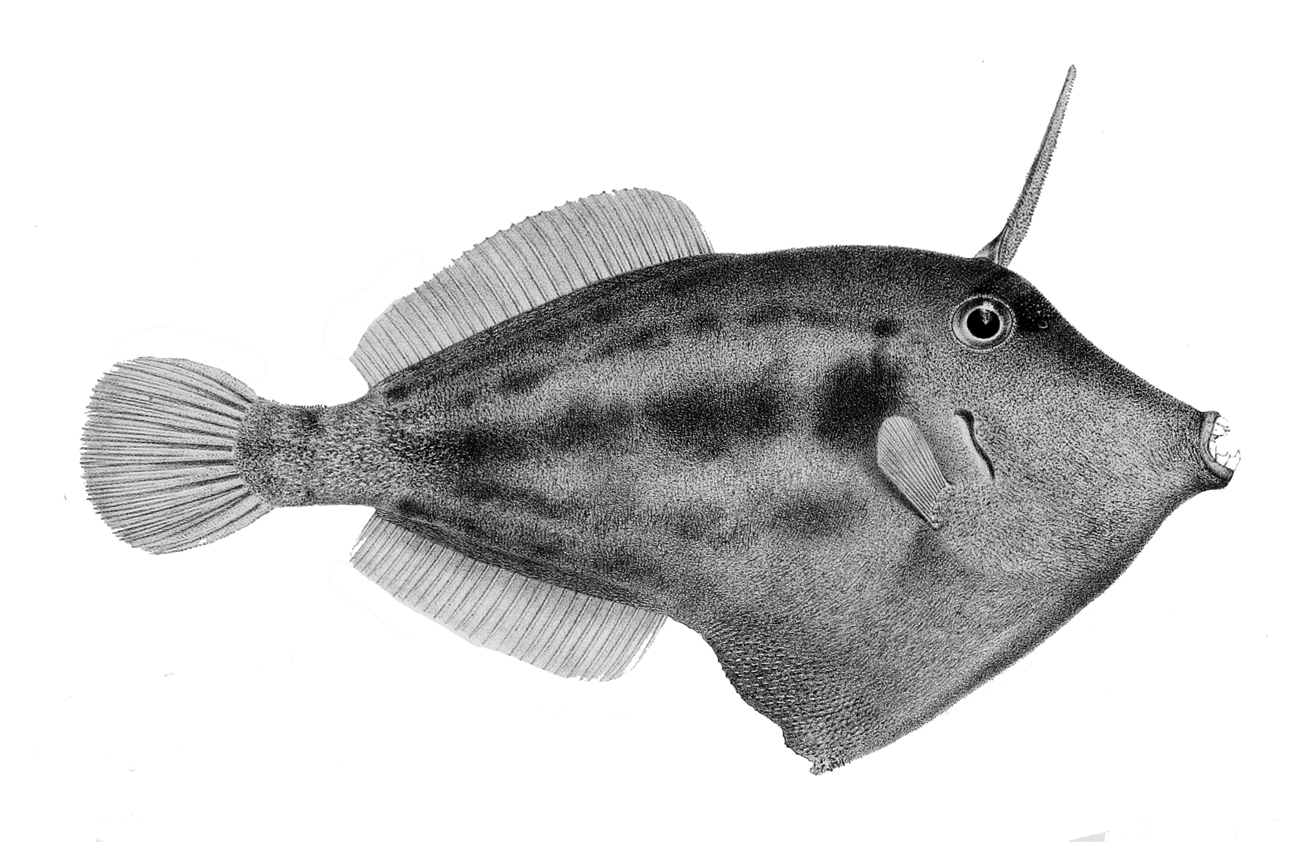
Some filefish appear scaleless because their scales are so small.

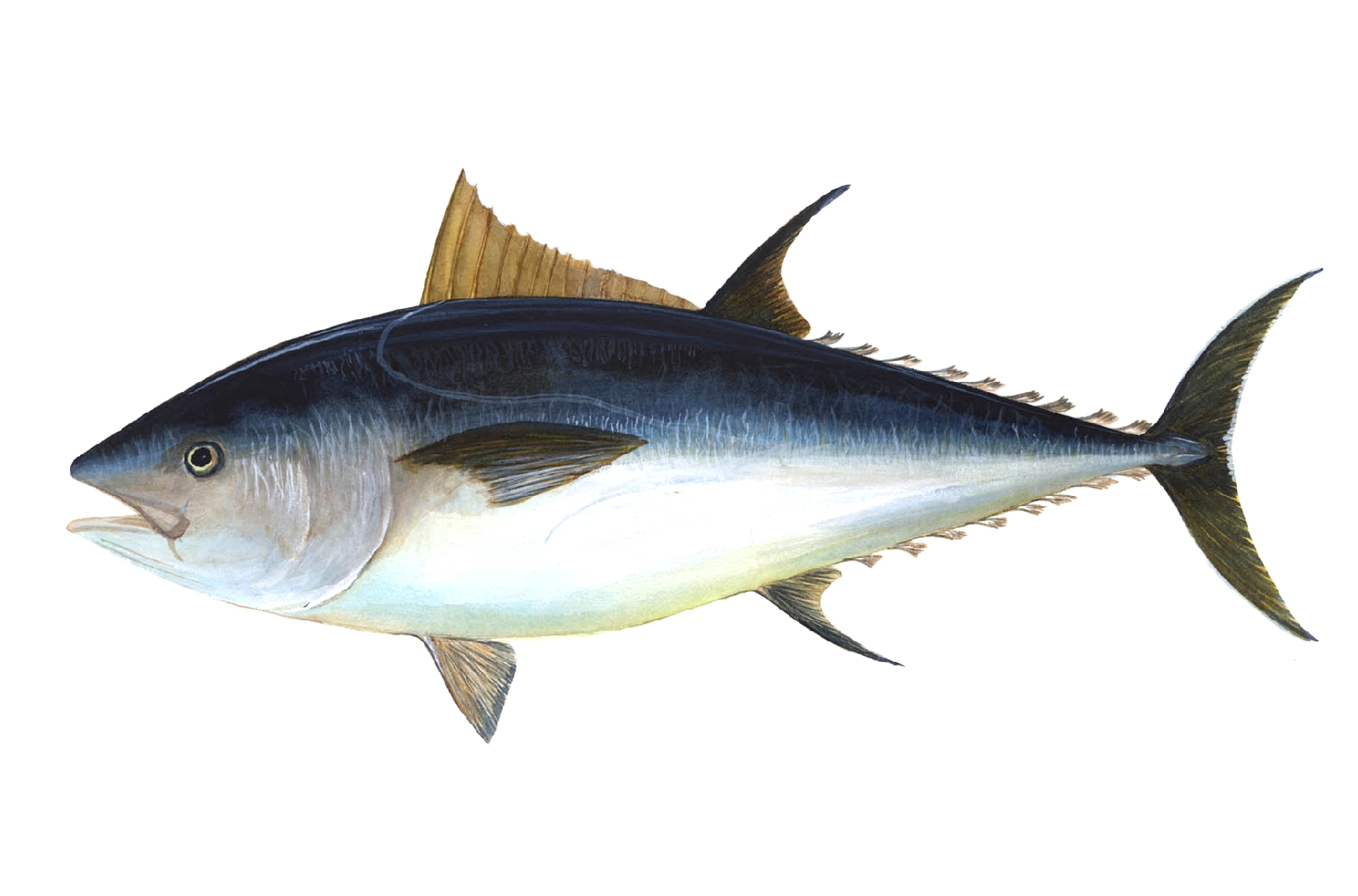
To casual examination tuna seem largely free of scales, but they are not.

== Lepidophagy ==
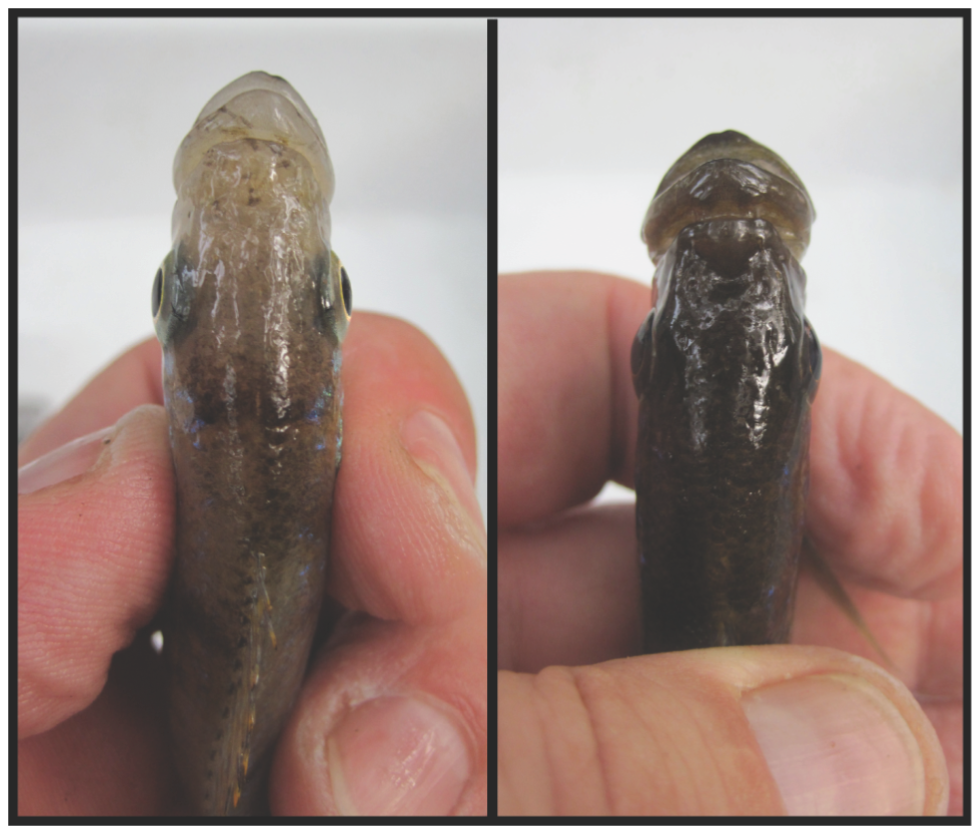
Dorsal view of right-bending (left) and left-bending (right) jaw morphs adapted for eating fish scales

Lepidophagy is a specialised feeding behaviour in fish that involves eating the scales of other fish. Lepidophagy has independently evolved in at least five freshwater families and seven marine families.

Fish scales can be nutritious, containing a dermal portion and a layer of protein-rich mucus apart from the layers of keratin and enamel. They are a rich source of calcium phosphate. However, the energy expended to make a strike versus the amount of scales consumed per strike puts a limit on the size of lepidophagous fish, and they are usually much smaller than their prey. Scale eating behaviour usually evolves because of lack of food and extreme environmental conditions. The eating of scales and the skin surrounding the scales provides protein rich nutrients that may not be available elsewhere in the niche.

== See also ==
- Age determination in fish
- Animal coloration
- Animal reflectors
- Photonic crystals
- Reptile scale
- Scale (zoology)
- Scale armour
- Snake scales
- Urokotori – Japanese fish scaler
