= Laminar sublayer =

The laminar sublayer, also called the viscous sublayer, is the region of a mainly-turbulent flow that is near a no-slip boundary and in which viscous shear stresses are important. As such, it is a type of boundary layer. The existence of the viscous sublayer can be understood in that the flow velocity decreases towards the no-slip boundary.

The laminar sublayer is important for river-bed ecology: below the laminar-turbulent interface, the flow is stratified, but above it, it rapidly becomes well-mixed. This threshold can be important in providing homes and feeding grounds for benthic organisms.

Whether the roughness due to the bed sediment or other factors are smaller or larger than this sublayer has an important bearing in hydraulics and sediment transport. Flow is defined as hydraulically rough if the roughness elements are larger than the laminar sublayer (thereby perturbing the flow), and as hydraulically smooth if they are smaller than the laminar sublayer (and therefore ignorable by the main body of the flow).
