= Self-cleaning surfaces =

Class of materials

Self-cleaning surfaces are a class of materials with the inherent ability to remove any debris or bacteria from their surfaces in a variety of ways. The self-cleaning functionality of these surfaces are commonly inspired by natural phenomena observed in lotus leaves, gecko feet, and water striders to name a few. The majority of self-cleaning surfaces can be placed into three categories:

1. superhydrophobic
2. superhydrophilic
3. photocatalytic.

== History ==
The first instance of a self-cleaning surface was created in 1995. Paz et al. created a transparent titanium dioxide (TiO_{2}) film that was used to coat glass and provide the ability for the glass to self-clean. The first commercial application of this self-cleaning surface, Pilkington Activ, was developed by Pilkington glass in 2001. This product implements a two-stage cleaning process. The first stage consists of photocatalysis of any fouling matter on the glass. This stage is followed by the glass becoming superhydrophilic and allowing water to wash away the catalyzed debris on the surface of the glass. Since the creation of self-cleaning glass, titanium dioxide has also been used to create self-cleaning nanoparticles that can be incorporated into other material surfaces to allow them to self-clean.

== Surface characteristics ==
The ability of a surface to self-clean commonly depends on the hydrophobicity or hydrophilicity of the surface. Whether cleaning aqueous or organic matter from a surface, water plays an important role in the self-cleaning process. Specifically, the contact angle of water on the surface is an important characteristic that helps determine the ability of a surface to self-clean. This angle is affected by the roughness of the surface and the following models have been developed to describe the "stickiness" or wettability of a self-cleaning surface.

=== Young's model ===
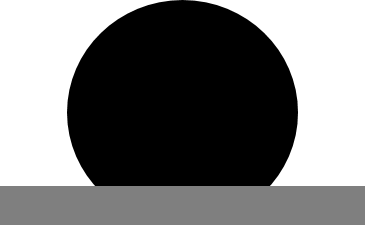
Young's model of wetting is used to describe the relationship between a water droplet and a perfectly flat surface. This model is typically used to explain the self-cleaning mechanism of lotus leaves.

Young and colleagues proposed Young's model of wetting that relates the contact angle of a water droplet on a flat surface to the surface energies of the water, the surface, and the surrounding air. This model is typically an oversimplification of a water droplet on an ideally flat surface. This model has been expanded upon to consider surface roughness as a factor in predicting water contact angle on a surface. Young's model is described by the following equation:

$\cos(\theta_0)=\left ( \frac{\gamma_\text{SA}-\gamma_\text{SL}}{\gamma_\text{LA}} \right )$

where

$\theta_0$ is the contact angle of water on the surface
$\gamma_\text{SA}$ is the surface energy of the surface-air interface
$\gamma_\text{SL}$ is the surface energy of surface–liquid interface
$\gamma_\text{LA}$is the surface energy of liquid–air interface

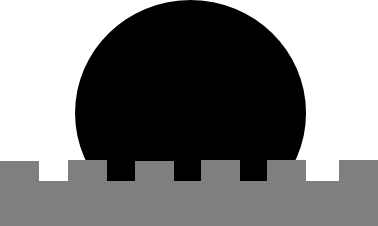
Wenzel's model of wetting is used to describe the interface between a water droplet and a rough surface.

=== Wenzel's model ===
When a water droplet is on a surface that is not flat and the surface topographical features lead to a surface area that is larger than that of a perfectly flat version of the same surface, the Wenzel model is a more accurate predictor of the wettability of this surface. Wenzel's model is described by the following equation:

$\cos(\theta)=R_\text{f} cos(\theta_0)$

where

$\theta$ is the contact angle of water predicted by Wenzel's model
$R_\text{f}$ is the ratio of surface area of rough surface to the surface area of a flat projection of the same surface

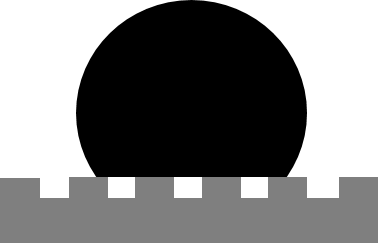
The Cassie–Baxter model of wetting is used to describe the interface between a water droplet and a surface when the water droplet creates air pockets between itself and the surface topographical features on the surface.

=== Cassie–Baxter model ===
For more complex systems that are representative of water-surface interactions in nature, the Cassie–Baxter model is used. This model takes into consideration the fact that a water droplet may trap air between itself and the surface that it is on. The Cassie–Baxter model is described by the following equation:

$\cos(\theta_\text{CB})=R_\text{f} \cos(\theta_0)-f_\text{LA}(R_\text{f} \cos(\theta_0)+1)$

where

$\theta_\text{CB}$ is the contact angle of water predicted by the Cassie–Baxter model
$f_\text{LA}$ is the liquid–air fraction, the fraction of the liquid droplet that is in contact with air

== Mechanisms ==
=== Use of water ===
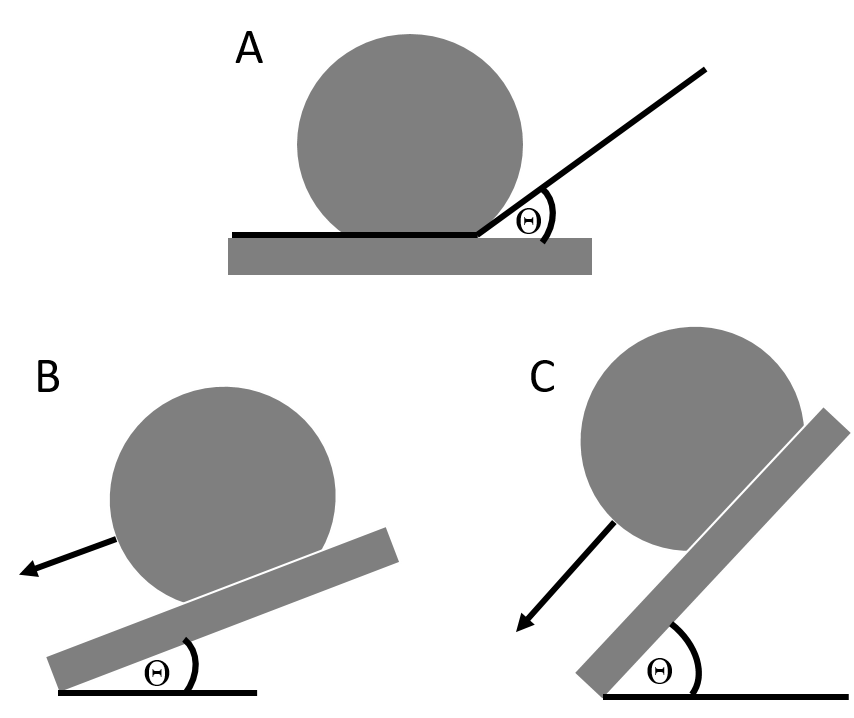
A) A superhydrophobic surface with a high contact angle nearing 180°. B) A surface with a low water sliding angle. C) A surface with a higher sliding angle that will be less efficient when self-cleaning water from its surface.

Control over surface wettability is a critical aspect of self-cleaning surfaces. Both superhydrophobic and superhydrophilic surfaces have been used as self-cleaning materials.

==== Superhydrophobic ====
Superhydrophobic surfaces can be created in a number of different ways including plasma or ion etching, crystal growth on a material surface, and nanolithography to name a few. All of these processes create nano-topographical features that imbue a surface with superhydrophobicity. The ultimate goal in developing superhydrophobic surfaces is to recreate the self-cleaning properties of the Lotus Leaf that has the inherent ability to repel all water in nature. The basis for superhydrophobic self-cleaning is the ability of these surfaces to prevent water from spreading out when in contact with the surface. This is reflected in a water contact angle nearing 180°. Superhydrophobic self-cleaning surfaces also have low sliding angles, which allows for water that is collected on the surface to easily be removed, commonly by gravity. While superhydrophobic surfaces are great for removing any water-based debris, these surfaces likely will not be able to clean away other types of fouling matter such as oil.

==== Superhydrophilic ====
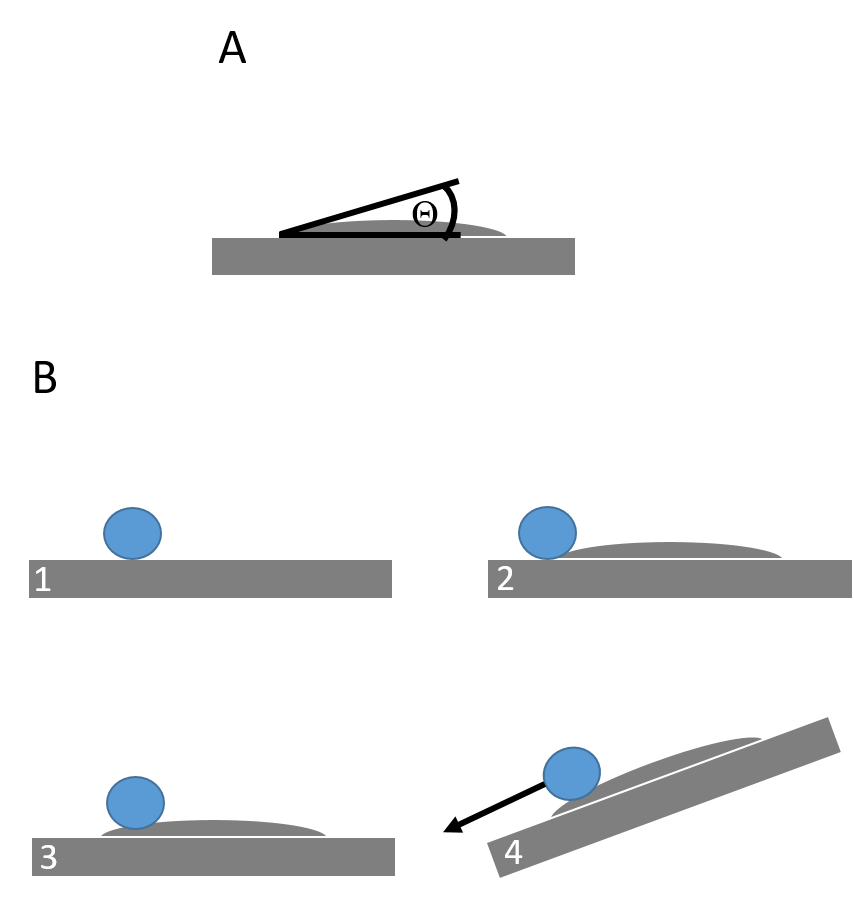
A) A water droplet on a superhydrophilic surface has a very low water contact angle since water will spread out on the surface. B) Dirt or debris (blue circle) on a super hydrophilic surface can be lifted off of the surface as water spreads beneath it. When water slides off of the surface, the debris is removed with the water.

Superhydrophilicity allows for surfaces to clean away a wide variety of dirt or debris. This mechanism is very different than the aforementioned superhydrophobic surfaces. For superhydrophilic self-cleaning surfaces, cleaning occurs because water on the surface is able to spread out to a great degree (extremely low water contact angle) to get between any fouling debris and the surface to wash away the debris.

=== Photocatalysis ===
One of the most commonly used self-cleaning products, titanium dioxide, utilizes a unique self-cleaning mechanism that combines an initial photocatalytic step and subsequent superhydrophilicity. A titanium dioxide coating, typically on glass windows, when exposed to UV light, will generate free electrons that will interact with oxygen and water in the air to create free radicals. These free radicals will in turn break down any fouling organic matter deposited on the surface of the glass. Titanium dioxide also changes the normally hydrophobic glass to a superhydrophilic surface. Thus, when rainfall occurs, instead of water beading up on the window surface and instantly falling down the glass, rain drops will rapidly spread out on the hydrophilic surface. The water will then move down the surface of the window, as a film rather than a droplet, essentially acting like a squeegee to remove surface debris.

=== Joule heating ===
Heating of the surfaces via passing current through a conductive transparent film has been shown to repel and remove contamination. It has been used in inkjet printers to reduced ink contamination on sensor windows.

=== Electric curtain ===
Cleaning surfaces in environments without water has been a challenge. Electric curtain devices were designed to remove particles by creating electric fields on the surface and carrying away particles due to their charged nature. It has been used in solar panels as well as 3D printers.

== In nature ==
=== Plants ===
==== Lotus leaf ====
The lotus flower has been known as a symbol of purity in some Asian cultures. The lotus leaves (Nelumbo nucifera) are water-repellent and poorly adhesive, which keep them free from contamination or pollution even being immersed in dirty water. This ability, called self-cleaning, shields the plant from dirt and pathogens and plays a vital role in providing resistance towards invading microbes. Indeed, numerous spores and conidia of pathogenic life forms, mainly fungi, need water for germination and taint leaves within the first signs of water. It had been a curiosity how lotus flower could remain clean even in muddy water, until German botanists, Barthlott and Neinhuis, introduced the unique dual structure of leaves with the help of a scanning electron microscopy (SEM). Papillose epidermis cells carpet the exterior of a plant, particularly the leaf. These cells generate papillae or microasperties that make surface very rough. On top of microscale roughness, the papillae surface is superimposed with nanoscale asperities consisting of three-dimensional (3-D) hydrophobic hydrocarbons: epicuticular waxes. Basically, the plant cuticle is a composite material composed of a network of cutin and low surface energy waxes, designed at different hierarchical levels. The various leveled surface of lotus leaves is made out of convex cells (looks like bumps) and a much smaller layer of waxy tubules. The water beads on plant leaves rest on the apex of the nanofeatures since air is enclosed in the valley of convex cells, which minimizes the contact area of water droplet. Hence, the lotus leaves represent remarkable superhydrophobicity. Static contact angle and contact angle hysteresis of the lotus leaf are determined around 164° and 3°, respectively. With small tilting angles, water droplets on the leaf roll off and take any dirt or contaminant along, leading to self-cleaning. The ability of drops to form and roll off, depends not only on hydrophobicity, but also on contact angle hysteresis.

In plants world, the lotus leaf is not the only example of natural superhydrophobic surfaces. For instance, taro (Colocasia esculenta) leaves were found to exhibit self-cleaning behavior, too. They have a binary roughness built up by averagely 10 μm elliptical protrusions in diameter and nano-sized pins. India canna (Cannageneralis bailey) leaves and the rice leaves (whatever the kind of rice) also represent superhydrophobicity, arising from the hierarchical surface morphology.

==== Nepenthes pitcher plants ====
The Nepenthes carnivorous pitcher, widespread in a lot of countries such as India, Indonesia, Malaysia and Australia, possesses a superhydrophilic surface, on which wetting angle approaches to zero to create uniform water film. Therefore, it increases the slipperiness of the surface and the prey slides off from its rims (peristome). Surface topography of Nepenthes rim demonstrates multiple scale radial ridges. The second order ridges are quite small in size and generated by straight rows of overlapping epidermidis cells. The surface of epidermidis cells are smooth and wax-free. The absence of wax crystals and microscopic roughness enhance the hydrophilicity and capillary forces, in doing so, water can swiftly wet the surface of rim.

=== Animals ===
==== Butterfly wings ====
Butterfly wings possess not only ultra-hydrophobic trait but also directional adhesive characteristics. If the water bead is along the radial outward (RO) direction from the body's central axis, it rolls off and cleans the dirt away, leading to self-cleaning. On the other hand, if droplets stand against the opposite direction, they are pinned at the surface, leading adhesion and securing the flight stability of the butterfly by preventing deposit of dirt on the wings near the center of the body. SEM micrographs of wings exhibit hierarchy along the RO direction, arising from aligned microgrooves, covered by fine lamella-stacking nanostripes.

==== Water striders (Gerris remigis) ====
Water striders (Gerris remigis), most commonly called Jesus bugs, have an extraordinary ability that lets them walk on the water. In a fashion similar to superhydrophobic plants, their legs are highly water repellent due to their hierarchical morphology. They are built up with hydrophobic waxy microhairs, microsetae, and each hair is covered with nanogrooves. As a result, air is entrapped between micro- and nanohairs, which repels water. Feng et al. measured how deep the leg can dip into water and the contact angle of the leg. They found the contact angle at least 168° and the maximum depth reported 4.38 ± 0.02 mm.

==== Gecko feet ====
Gecko feet are the most famous reversible adhesion mechanism in nature. The anti-fouling ability of feet allows geckos to run on dusty ceilings and corners without the accumulation of dirt on their feet. In 2000, Autumn et al. revealed the origin of gecko's strong adhesion by investigating the surface features of the toes under electron microscope. They observed a hierarchical morphology of each foot, which is composed of millions of small hair called setae. Moreover, each setae is composed of a smaller hair, and each hair is tailed with a flat spatula and these spatulae are bonded by the van der Waals forces. This surface feature, regardless of the surface type (hydrophobic, hydrophilic, dry, wet, rough etc.), enables geckos to stick the surface. In addition to strong adhesion, the gecko foot has a unique self-cleaning property that does not require water as the lotus leaf.

==== Shark skin ====
Shark skin is another example of antifouling, self-cleaning and low adhesion surfaces. This hydrophobic surface allows sharks to maneuvers fast in water. Shark skin is composed of periodically arranged diamond-shape dermal denticles, superimposed with triangular riblets.

== Fabrication and characterization ==
To fabricate synthetic self-cleaning surfaces, there are a variety of methods used to obtain the desired nanotopography and then characterize surface nanostructure and wettability.

=== Templating strategies ===
Templating utilizes a mold to add nanostructure to a polymer. Molds can come from a variety of sources including natural sources, such as the lotus leaf, due to their self-cleaning properties.

==== Nanocasting ====
Nanocasting is a method based on soft lithography that uses elastomeric molds to make nano-structured surfaces. For example, polydimethylsiloxane (PDMS) was cast over the lotus leaf and used to make a negative PDMS template. PDMS was then coated with an anti-stick monolayer of trimethylchlorosilane and used to make a positive PDMS template from the first. As the natural lotus leaf structure enables pronounced self-cleaning ability, this templating technique was able to replicate the nanostructure, resulting in a surface wettability similar to the lotus leaf. Further, the ease of this methodology enables translation to mass replication of nano-structured surfaces.

==== Imprint nanolithography ====
Imprint nanolithography also utilizes templates, pressing a hard mold into a polymer above the polymer glass transition temperature (T_{g}). Thus, the driving forces for this type of fabrication are heat and high pressure. Porous templates consisting of aluminum with anodized aluminum oxide (a hard mold) were used to imprint polystyrene. To achieve this, the polystyrene was heated well above its T_{g} to 130 °C and pressed against the template. The template was then removed by dissolving the aluminum and producing either nanoemboss or nanofiber surfaces. Increasing the aspect ratio of the nanofibers disrupted the uniform hexagonal pattern and caused the fibers to form bundles. Ultimately, the longest nanofibers resulted in the greatest surface roughness, which significantly decreased surface wettability.

==== Capillary nanolithography ====
Similar to imprint nanolithography, capillary nanolithography employs a patterned elastomeric mold. However, instead of utilizing high pressure, when the temperature is raised above the T_{g}, capillary forces enable the polymer to fill the voids within the mold. Suh and Jon used molds made from poly(urethane acrylate) (PUA). These were placed on spin coated, water-soluble polymer, polyethylene glycol (PEG), which was raised above PEG's T_{g}. This study found that the addition of nanotopography increased the contact angle, and this increase was dependent on the height of the nanotopography. Often, this technique produces a meniscus on the tip of the protruding nanostructures, characteristic of capillary action. The mold can later be dissolved away. Combinatorial lithography approaches are also used. One study used capillarity to fill PDMS molds with PUA, first partially curing the polymer resin with UV light. After microstructures were formed, pressure was applied to fabricate nanostructures, and UV curing was used again. This study is a good example of the use of hierarchical structures to increase surface hydrophobicity.

==== Photolithography or X-ray lithography ====
Photolithography and X-ray lithography have been used to etch substrates, often silicon. A resist, or photosensitive material, is coated onto a substrate. A mask is applied above the resist that often consists of gold or other compounds that absorb X-rays. The region exposed to light either becomes soluble in a photoresist developer (e.g. radical species) or insoluble in a photoresist developer (e.g. crosslinked species), ultimately resulting in a patterned surface. X-ray sources are beneficial over UV-visible light sources as the shorter wavelengths enable production of smaller features.

=== Other fabrication strategies ===
==== Plasma treatment ====
Plasma treatment of surfaces is essentially a dry etching of the surface. This is achieved by filling a chamber with gas, such as oxygen, fluorine, or chlorine, and accelerating ions species from an ion source through plasma. The ion acceleration towards the surface forms deep grooves within the surface. In addition to the topography, plasma treatment can also provide surface functionalization by using different gases to deposit different elements on surfaces. Surface roughness is dependent on the duration of plasma etching.

==== Chemical deposition ====
Generally, chemical deposition uses liquid or vapor phases to deposit inorganic materials or halides onto surfaces as thin films. Reagents are supplied in the appropriate stoichiometric amounts to react on the surface. Types of chemical deposition include chemical vapor deposition, chemical bath deposition, and electrochemical deposition. These methodologies produce thin crystalline nanostructures. For example, brucite-type cobalt hydroxide crystalline surfaces were produced by chemical bath deposition and coated with lauric acid. These surfaces had individual nanofiber tips with diameters of 6.5 nm, ultimately resulting in a contact angle as high as 178°.

=== Surface characterization methods ===
==== Scanning electron microscopy (SEM) ====
SEM is used to examine morphology of fabricated surfaces, enabling the comparison of natural surfaces with synthetic surfaces. The size of nanotopography can be measured. To prepare samples for SEM, surfaces are often sputter coated using platinum, gold/palladium, or silver, which reduces sample damage and charging and improves edge resolution.

==== Contact angle ====
As described above, contact angle is used to characterize surface wettability. A droplet of solvent, typically water for hydrophobic surfaces, is placed perpendicular to the surface. The droplet is imaged and the angle between the solid/liquid and liquid/vapor interfaces is measured. Samples are considered to be superhydrophobic when the contact angle is greater than 150°. Refer to section on Wenzel and Cassie–Baxter models for information on the different behaviors of droplets on topographical surfaces. For drops to roll effectively on a superhydrophobic surface, Contact angle hysteresis is an important consideration. Low levels of contact angle hysteresis will enhance the self-cleaning effect of a superhydrophobic surface.

==== Atomic force microscopy (AFM) ====
Atomic-force microscopy is used to study the local roughness and mechanical properties of a surface. AFM is also used to characterize adhesion and friction properties for micro- and nano-patterned superhydrophobic surfaces. Results can be used to fit a curve to the surface topography and determine the radius of curvature of nanostructures.

== Biomimetic synthetic surfaces ==
Biomimicry is the imitation, or mimicry, of biological systems, models, or structures, in synthetic areas. Oftentimes, biological materials can produce structures, that have properties and qualities far exceeding what synthetic materials can achieve. Biomimicry is being used to create comparable properties in synthetic materials, particularly in wettability and self-cleaning abilities of self-cleaning surfaces.

=== Superhydrophobic biomimetic surfaces ===
There are several biological surfaces that have superhydrophobic properties far superior to any synthetic materials: lotus leaves, rice leaves, cicadia wings, and butterfly wings.

==== Lotus leaf ====
Researchers have been using carbon nanotubes (CNTs) to mimic the papillae of lotus leaves. CNT nanoforests can be made using chemical vapor deposition techniques. CNTs can be applied on a surface to modify its water contact angle. Lau et al. created vertical CNT forests with a polytetrafluroethylene (PTFE) coating that was both stable and superhydrophobic with an advancing and receding contact angle of 170° and 160°. Jung and Bhushan have created a superhydrophobic surface by spray coating CNTs with an epoxy resin. The spacing and alignment of the CNTs have been shown to impact the degree of hydrophobicity a surface has. Sun et al., have found that CNTs aligned vertically with a medium spacing display the best hydrophobic properties. Small and large spacing shows increased drop spreading, while horizontal orientation may even display hydrophilic properties.

Glass silica beads in an epoxy resin, and the electrochemical deposition of gold into dendritic structures has also created synthetic biomimetic surfaces similar to lotus leaves.

==== Rice leaves ====
Carbon nanotubes have also been used to create surfaces similar to rice leaves. Similar to the lotus leaf, a hierarchical structure provides the hydrophobicity of rice leaf. Unlike the lotus leaf, rice leaves have an anisotropic structure. When CNTs are made to mimic rice leaf papillae patterns, the contact angle to differ along the CNT direction or perpendicular. Sun et al. observed anisotropic dewetting of this CNT film. They then hypothesized and tested a three-dimensional anisotropic CNT array, which in fact exhibited anisotropic dewetting depending on the CNT spacing.

==== Cicadia wing ====
Cicadia wings have a surface of hexagonally close packed nanopillars that have been shown to have self-cleaning properties. Similarly templated nanopatterned silica arrays have been shown to have hydrophobic, anti-reflective, and self-cleaning properties. These silica arrays begin as non-close packed monolayers, and are patterned in a series of etching steps involving chlorine and oxygen reactive ion etching, and a hydrofluoric acid wash. These properties have implicated that this surface pattern may prove to be useful in solar cell applications. Biomimetic materials based on the cicadia wing have also been made from polytetrafluoroethylene films with carbon/epoxy supports treated with argon and oxygen ion beams. A nanoimprint patterned surface based on the cicadia wings has been made by electrochemically templating and aluminum sheet with alumina oxide, and using this template to pattern a polymer surface.

==== Butterfly wing ====
Butterfly wings also exhibit anisotropic self-cleaning, superhydrophobic properties. The butterfly wings exhibit anisotropy on a one dimensional level, compared to the other biological materials, which exhibited the anisotropy on a two dimensional level. Butterfly wings are composed of overlapping layers of scales, that have the best self-cleaning properties in the radial directions. This anisotropic interface my prove important for fluid controllable interfaces. Alumina layers patterned from the original butterfly wing have been used to mimic the structure and properties of the butterfly wings. Additionally, butterfly wing mimetic structures have used to fabricate anatase titania photoanodes. Butterfly wing structures have also been made using layer-by-layer sol-gel-based deposition and soft lithography molding.

==== Gecko feet ====
Gecko feet are hydrophobic, but that is not the only property that assists in their self-cleaning nature. Estrada and Lin created polypropylene, polyethylene, and polycaprolactone nanofibers using a porous template. These nanofiber geometries were shown to be self-cleaning in fiber dimensions of 5, 0.6, and 0.2 microns. However, a hydrophobic surface alone does not explain the perpetually clean toe pad of the gecko, even in dry environments, where water is not available for self-cleaning. This resulting fouling is a common problem for reversible adhesives modeled after the gecko toe pad. Digital hyperextension, or a movement of the toe with each gecko step, contributes to the self-cleaning. A surface or system that mimics this dynamic self-cleaning process has yet to be developed.

=== Hydrophilic biomimetic surfaces ===
==== Snail shell ====
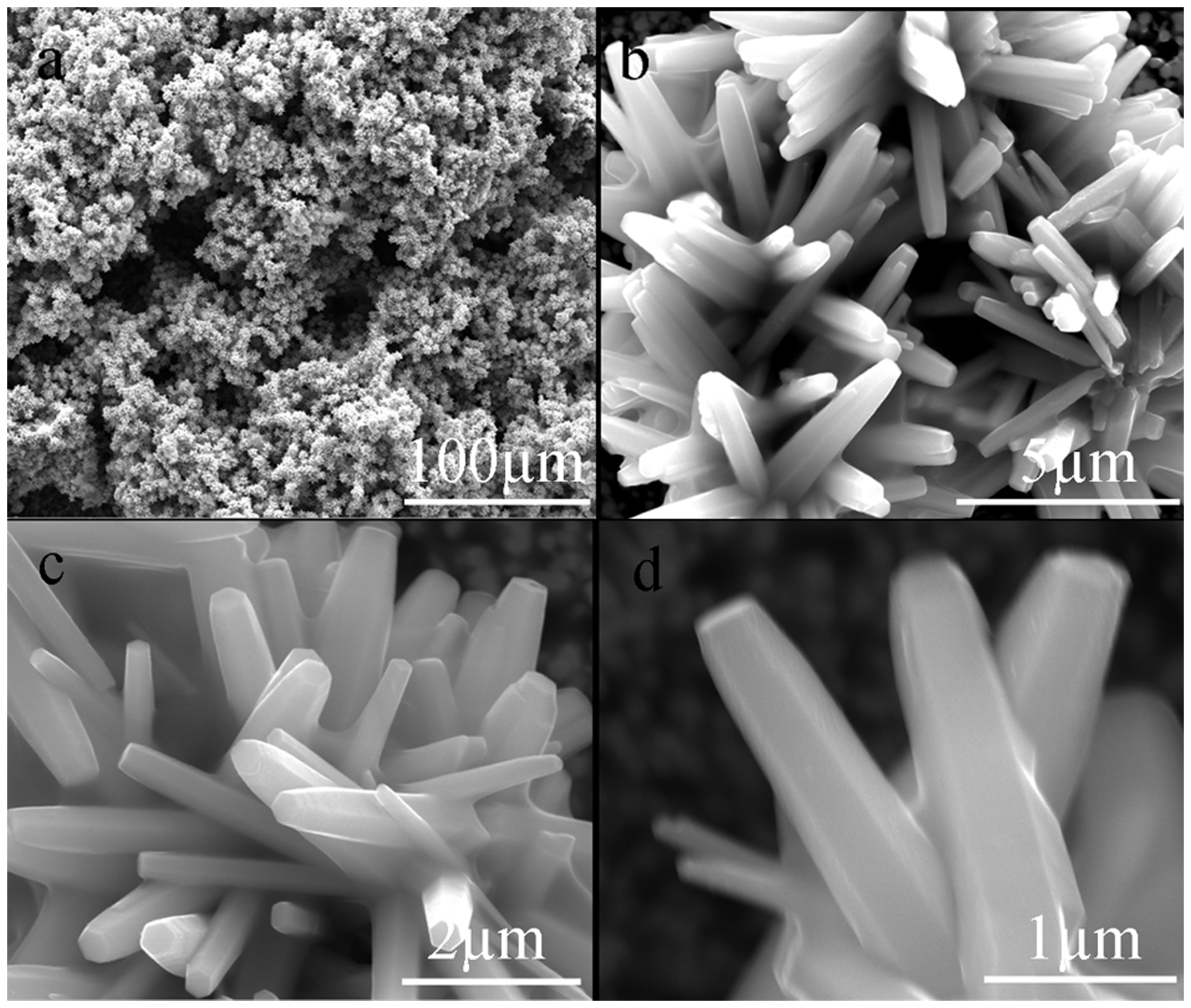
FE-SEM images of a hierarchical synthetically made ZnO film. The hierarchical structure of this particular film makes it more hydrophilic. Other biomimetic surfaces are created with similar structures to control wettability properties. Magnifications are (a) × 800, (b) × 20000, (c) × 40000, (d) × 80000.

Snail shell is an aragonite-protein composite, with a hierarchical groove structure. The regular roughness of the structure creates a hydrophilic structure, a thin layer of water trapped on the surface, that doesn't allow oil to attach to the snail shell, thereby keeping the shell clean. These surface properties of snail shell have inspired the use of similar surface patterns on ceramic tiles and ceramic structures by the INAX corporation, which applies these techniques to kitchens and bathrooms.

==== Fish scale ====
Fish scales are calcium phosphate composites coated with a mucus layer. Fish scale properties have been mimicked by polyacrylamide hydrogels, which are both hydrophilic and mimic the mucus's retention of water. Additionally, fish scales have been used as a template for a casting technique, and as a model for a lithography and chemical etching techniques on silicon wafers that exhibited oleophobic contact angles of oil in water of 163° and 175°, respectively.

==== Shark skin ====
Molded and laser-ablated shark skin replicas have been fabricated, and shown to be oleophobic in water. The molded replicas use a negative made of polyvinylsiloxane dental wax and the positive replica was made of epoxy. These replicas have also shown that the structure of shark skin reduces the fluid drag caused by turbulent flow. The fluid dynamic properties of sharkskin have been mimicked in swimsuit, nautical, and aerospace applications.

=== Super hydrophilic biomimetic surfaces ===
==== Pitcher plant ====
Wong et al. developed a surface inspired by the system on the pitcher plant. This surface, named "slippery liquid-infused porous surfaces" (SLIPS) is a micro- or nano-porous substrate, with a lubricating liquid locked in place. For the system to work, the lubricating liquid must fully wet the substrate, the solid must be preferentially wetted by the lubricating substrate when compared to the repelling substrate, and the lubricating and encroaching liquid must be immiscible. Although the concept of SLIPS was biomimetic of the pitcher plant, it is not superhydrophilic with a contact angle of 116°, though it does repel blood and oil.
