= Wetting transition =

A wetting transition (Cassie–Wenzel transition) may occur during the process of wetting of a solid (or liquid) surface with a liquid. The transition corresponds to a certain change in contact angle, the macroscopic parameter characterizing wetting. Various contact angles can co-exist on the same solid substrate. Wetting transitions may occur in a different way depending on whether the surface is flat or rough.

== Flat surfaces ==
When a liquid drop is put onto a flat surface, two situations may result. If the contact angle is zero, the situation is referred to as complete wetting. If the contact angle is between 0 and 180°, the situation is called partial wetting. A wetting transition is a surface phase transition from partial wetting to complete wetting.

== Rough surfaces ==
The situation on rough surfaces is much more complicated. The main characteristic of the wetting properties of rough surfaces is the so-called apparent contact angle (APCA). It is well known that the APCA usually measured are different from those predicted by the Young equation. Two main hypotheses were proposed in order to explain this discrepancy, namely the Wenzel and Cassie wetting models. According to the traditional Cassie model, air can remain trapped below the drop, forming "air pockets". Thus, the hydrophobicity of the surface is strengthened because the drop sits partially on air. On the other hand, according to the Wenzel model the roughness increases the area of a solid surface, which also geometrically modifies the wetting properties of this surface. Transition from Cassie to Wenzel regime is also called wetting transition. Under certain external stimuli, such as pressure or vibration, the Cassie air trapping wetting state could be converted into the Wenzel state. Apart from external stimuli, intrinsic contact angle of the liquid (below or above 90 degree), liquid volatility, structure of cavities (reentrant or non-reentrant, connected or unconnected) are known to be important factors determining the rate of wetting transition. Complex structures such as hierarchical structures, and concave structures are reported to prevent wetting transition. It is well accepted that the Cassie air trapping wetting regime corresponds to a higher energetic state, and the Cassie–Wenzel transition is irreversible. However, the mechanism of the transition remains unclear. It was suggested that the Cassie–Wenzel transition occurs via a nucleation mechanism starting from the drop center. On the other hand, recent experiments showed that the Cassie–Wenzel transition is more likely to be due to the displacement of a triple line under an external stimulus. The existence of so-called impregnating Cassie wetting state also has to be considered. Understanding wetting transitions is of a primary importance for design of superhydrophobic surfaces.

== See also ==
- Surface tension
