= Water resistance =

Water resistance may refer to:

- The WR mark on a wristwatch indicating its ability to withstand exposure to water
- The IP code on a mechanical or electrical enclosure indicating its ability to resist the ingress of water
- Wet strength, a measure of the strength of paper when wet
- Waterproofing, making objects or structures resist the ingress of water under specified conditions
- Fluid resistance, drag in water
- Lotus effect (water-resistance in plant leaves)
- The electrical resistivity of water (0.2 Ω·m sea water, 2 to 200 Ω·m drinking water, 180000 Ω·m deionized water at 20°C)

See also:

- Hydrophobe
- Superhydrophobe
