= Nanopin film =

Nanopin film is an experimental material in nanotechnology developed in 2005 with unusual superhydrophobic properties. A droplet of water makes contact with the surface of this film and forms an almost perfect sphere with a contact angle of 178°. This happens because it is covered with nanoscale, topped-off pins or cones perpendicular to the surface. The surface is regarded as a composite material with mostly air and a small fraction constituted by the tops of the cones. When the contact angle of the cone material is sufficiently large, Cassie's law predicts large contact angle values for the composite.

This particular nanopin film is produced with borosilicate glass. A solution of CoCl_{2}•6H_{2}O or cobalt chloride hexahydrate is heated at 60 °C for 24 hours in a chemical bath deposition to form a brucite type cobalt(II) hydroxide layer with composition

CoOH_{1.13}Cl_{0.09}(CO_{3})_{0.39}.0.05H_{2}0

The top coating is provided by lauric acid in a separate step. A 3 square micrometer surface now contains on average 166 such cones with cone height of around 100 nm, and the cone diameter at the tip is 6.5 nm. The Cassie's law prediction for this material with the lauric acid surface area contact fraction of 0.000612 and flat film contact angle of 75° is 177.8°.
