= HeiQ Materials AG =

HeiQ (German pronunciation: [ˈhaɪkju]) is HeiQ Group. The mother company of the group is a Swiss specialty chemistry company, HeiQ Materials AG, headquartered in Zurich, Switzerland. It was founded in 2005 as a spin-off of Swiss Federal Institute of Technology Zurich (ETH).

HeiQ produces and sells textile finishing and other auxiliaries. But its core business activity is to conduct co-joint research and development projects with consumer textile products brands such as those that produce and market apparels (e.g. Patagonia, Mammut, Hanes) and home furnishings (e.g. Bekeart, IKEA) or textile producers for textile finishing to achieve effects that are currently not in market or not optimized to certain products.

For the Deepwater Horizon oil spill that began in April 2010 in the Gulf of Mexico, HeiQ, TWE Group and Beyond Surface Technologies jointly developed an oil-absorbing, water-repelling, nonwoven fabric, in the name Oilguard for oil relief efforts. The product was intended for beach protection against oil spills and was applied to the shoreline. This allows for the fabric to absorb crude oil while repelling the seawater. This innovation was rewarded the Swiss Technology Award (2010) and the Swiss Award (2013). The water-repelling property of Oilguard is achieved with a textile finishing that creates the Lotus Effect on the surface of the non-woven fabric. The non-fluorinated finishing makes the fabric only water repellent but not oil repellent, therefore the fabric absorbs oil crudes but not the seawater.

Due to the COVID-19 pandemic, HeiQ announced the launch of an "antiviral and antimicrobial textile treatment that was tested effective against coronavirus".

The HeiQ Group consists of HeiQ Materials AG and its subsidiaries in North Carolina (HeiQ ChemTex), Shanghai, Taiwan, Hong Kong, Portugal and Australia.
