= Ultrahydrophobicity =

Material property of extreme resistance to wetting

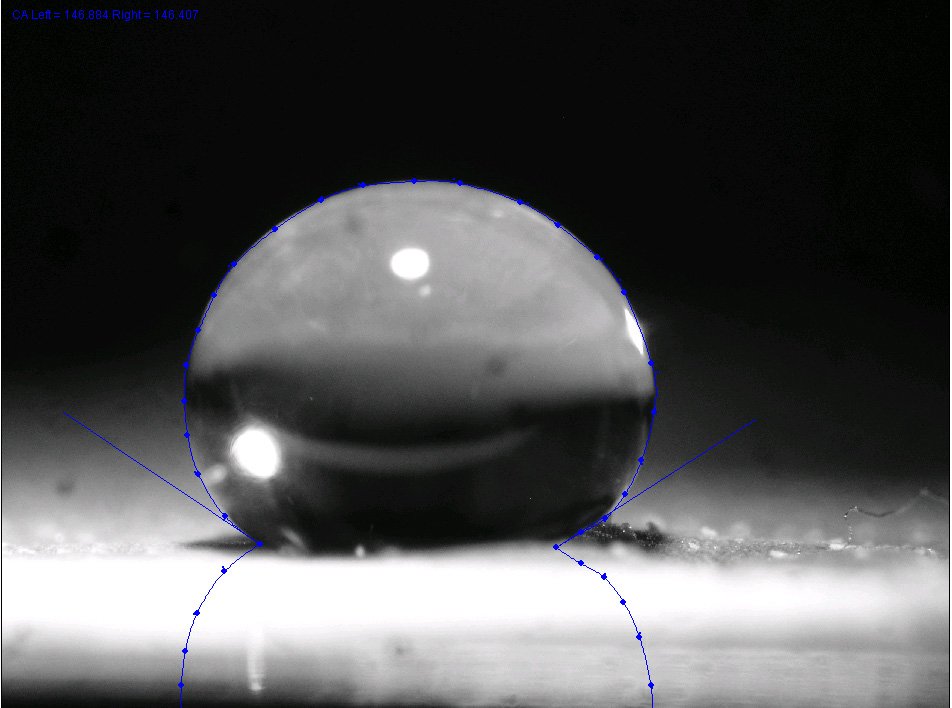
A drop on a lotus surface, with a contact angle of greater than 146°.

A water droplet falling onto a superhydrophobic, elastic surface.

In chemistry and materials science, ultrahydrophobic (or superhydrophobic) surfaces are highly hydrophobic, i.e., extremely difficult to wet. The contact angles of a water droplet on an ultrahydrophobic material exceed 150°. This is also referred to as the lotus effect, after the superhydrophobic leaves of the lotus plant. A droplet striking these kinds of surfaces can fully rebound like an elastic ball. Interactions of bouncing drops can be further reduced using special superhydrophobic surfaces that promote symmetry breaking, pancake bouncing or waterbowl bouncing.

== Theory ==
In 1805, Thomas Young defined the contact angle θ by analysing the forces acting on a fluid droplet resting on a smooth solid surface surrounded by a gas.

A liquid droplet rests on a solid surface and is surrounded by gas. The contact angle, θ_{C}, is the angle formed by a liquid at the three phase boundary where the liquid, gas, and solid intersect.

A droplet resting on a solid surface and surrounded by a gas forms a characteristic contact angle θ. If the solid surface is rough, and the liquid is in intimate contact with the solid asperities, the droplet is in the Wenzel state. If the liquid rests on the tops of the asperities, it is in the Cassie-Baxter state.

$$\gamma_{SG}\ =\gamma_{SL}+\gamma_{LG}\cos{\theta}$$

where

$\gamma_{SG}\$ = Interfacial tension between the solid and gas
$\gamma_{SL}\$ = Interfacial tension between the solid and liquid
$\gamma_{LG}\$ = Interfacial tension between the liquid and gas

θ can be measured using a contact angle goniometer.

Wenzel determined that when the liquid is in intimate contact with a microstructured surface, θ will change to θ_{W*}

$$\cos\theta_W* = r \cos\theta$$

where r is the ratio of the actual area to the projected area. Wenzel's equation shows that microstructuring a surface amplifies the natural tendency of the surface. A hydrophobic surface (one that has an original contact angle greater than 90°) becomes more hydrophobic when microstructured – its new contact angle becomes greater than the original. However, a hydrophilic surface (one that has an original contact angle less than 90°) becomes more hydrophilic when microstructured – its new contact angle becomes less than the original.

Cassie and Baxter found that if the liquid is suspended on the tops of microstructures, θ will change to θ_{CB*}

$$\cos\theta_{CB}* = \varphi(\cos\theta + 1) - 1$$

where φ is the area fraction of the solid that touches the liquid. Liquid in the Cassie-Baxter state is more mobile than in the Wenzel state.

It can be predicted whether the Wenzel or Cassie-Baxter state should exist by calculating the new contact angle with both equations. By a minimization of free energy argument, the relation that predicted the smaller new contact angle is the state most likely to exist. Stated mathematically, for the Cassie-Baxter state to exist, the following inequality must be true.

$$\cos\theta<\frac{\varphi-1}{r-\varphi}$$

A recent alternative criteria for the Cassie-Baxter state asserts that the Cassie-Baxter state exists when the following two criteria are met:

1) Contact line forces overcome body forces of unsupported droplet weight and

2) The microstructures are tall enough to prevent the liquid that bridges microstructures from touching the base of the microstructures.

Contact angle is a measure of static hydrophobicity, and contact angle hysteresis and slide angle are dynamic measures. Contact angle hysteresis is a phenomenon that characterizes surface heterogeneity. When a pipette injects a liquid onto a solid, the liquid will form some contact angle. As the pipette injects more liquid, the droplet will increase in volume, the contact angle will increase, but its three phase boundary will remain stationary until it suddenly advances outward. The contact angle the droplet had immediately before advancing outward is termed the advancing contact angle. The receding contact angle is now measured by pumping the liquid back out of the droplet. The droplet will decrease in volume, the contact angle will decrease, but its three phase boundary will remain stationary until it suddenly recedes inward. The contact angle the droplet had immediately before receding inward is termed the receding contact angle. The difference between advancing and receding contact angles is termed contact angle hysteresis and can be used to characterize surface heterogeneity, roughness, and mobility. Surfaces that are not homogeneous will have domains which impede motion of the contact line. The slide angle is another dynamic measure of hydrophobicity and is measured by depositing a droplet on a surface and tilting the surface until the droplet begins to slide. Liquids in the Cassie-Baxter state generally exhibit lower slide angles and contact angle hysteresis than those in the Wenzel state.

A simple model can be used to predict the effectiveness of a synthetic micro- or nano-fabricated surface for its conditional state (Wenzel or Cassie-Baxter), contact angle and contact angle hysteresis. The main factor of this model is the contact line density, Λ, which is the total perimeter of asperities over a given unit area.

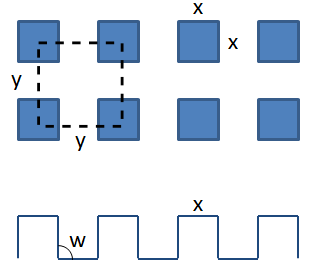
Sample hydrophobic surface composed of square pillars. Λ = 4x/y^{2}

The critical contact line density Λ_{C} is a function of body and surface forces, as well as the projected area of the droplet.

$$\Lambda_{C}=\frac{-\rho{g}{V^{1/3}}\Big(\Big(\frac{1-\cos(\theta_{a})}{\sin(\theta_{a})}\Big)\Big(3+\Big(\frac{1-\cos(\theta_{a})}{\sin(\theta_{a})}\Big)^2\Big)\Big)^{2/3}}{(36\pi)^{1/3}\gamma \cos(\theta_{a,0}+w-90)}$$

where

ρ = density of the liquid droplet
g = acceleration due to gravity
V = volume of the liquid droplet
θ_{a} = advancing apparent contact angle
θ_{a,0} = advancing contact angle of a smooth substrate
γ = surface tension of the liquid
w = tower wall angle

If Λ > Λ_{C}, drops are suspended in the Cassie-Baxter state. Otherwise, the droplet will collapse into the Wenzel state.

To calculate updated advancing and receding contact angles in the Cassie-Baxter state, the following equations can be used.

$$\theta_{a} = \lambda_{p}(\theta_{a,0}+w)+(1-\lambda_{p})\theta_{air}$$

$$\theta_{r} = \lambda_{p}\theta_{r,0}+(1-\lambda_{p})\theta_{air}$$

with also the Wenzel state:

$$\theta_{a} = \lambda_{p}(\theta_{a,0}+w)+(1-\lambda_{p})\theta_{a,0}$$

$$\theta_{r} = \lambda_{p}(\theta_{r,0}-w)+(1-\lambda_{p})\theta_{r,0}$$

where

λ_{p} = linear fraction of contact line on the asperities
θ_{r,0} = receding contact angle of a smooth substrate
θ_{air} = contact angle between liquid and air (typically assumed to be 180°)

== Unitary versus hierarchical roughness structures ==

M. Nosonovsky and B. Bhushan studied the effect of unitary (non-hierarchical) structures of micro and nano roughness, and hierarchical structures (micro roughness covered with nano roughness). They found that hierarchical structure was not only necessary for a high contact angle but essential for the stability of the water-solid and water-air interfaces (the composite interface). Due to an external perturbation, a standing capillary wave can form at the liquid–air interface. If the amplitude of the capillary wave is greater than the height of the asperity, the liquid can touch the valley between the asperities; and if the angle under which the liquid comes in contact with the solid is greater than h_{0}, it is energetically profitable for the liquid to fill the valley. The effect of capillary waves is more pronounced for small asperities with heights comparable to the wave amplitude. An example of this is seen in the case of unitary roughness, where the amplitude of asperity is very low. This is why the likelihood of instability of a unitary interface will be very high. However, in a recent study, Eyal Bittoun and Abraham Marmur found that multiscale roughness is not necessarily essential for superhydrophobicity but beneficial for mechanical stability of the surface.

== Examples in nature ==
Many very hydrophobic materials found in nature rely on Cassie's law and are biphasic on the submicrometer level. The fine hairs on some plants are hydrophobic, designed to exploit the solvent properties of water to attract and remove sunlight-blocking dirt from their photosynthetic surfaces. Inspired by this lotus effect, many functional superhydrophobic surfaces have been developed.

Water striders are insects that live on the surface film of water, and their bodies are effectively unwettable due to specialized hairpiles called hydrofuge; many of their body surfaces are covered with these specialized "hairpiles", composed of tiny hairs spaced so closely that there are more than one thousand microhairs per mm, which creates a hydrophobic surface. Similar hydrofuge surfaces are known in other insects, including aquatic insects that spend most of their lives submerged, with hydrophobic hairs preventing entry of water into their respiratory system. The skin surface of some species of lizards, such as geckos and anoles, has also been documented as highly hydrophobic, and may facilitate self-cleaning or underwater breathing.

Some birds are great swimmers, due to their hydrophobic feather coating. Penguins are coated in a layer of air and can release that trapped air to accelerate rapidly when needing to jump out of the water and land on higher ground. Wearing an air coat when swimming reduces the drag and also acts as a heat insulator.

== Recent research ==
Cutting a water droplet using a superhydrophobic knife on superhydrophobic surfaces.

Water droplets rolling down a 5° tilted superhydrophobic surface.

Dettre and Johnson discovered in 1964 that the superhydrophobic lotus effect phenomenon was related to rough hydrophobic surfaces, and they developed a theoretical model based on experiments with glass beads coated with paraffin or TFE telomer. The self-cleaning property of superhydrophobic micro-nanostructured surfaces was reported in 1977. Perfluoroalkyl, perfluoropolyether and RF plasma formed superhydrophobic materials were developed, used for electrowetting and commercialized for bio-medical applications between 1986 and 1995. Other technology and applications have emerged since the mid-1990s.. A durable superhydrophobic hierarchical composition, applied in one or two steps, was disclosed in 2002 comprising nano-sized particles ≤ 100 nanometers overlaying a surface having micrometer-sized features or particles ≤ 100 µm. The larger particles were observed to protect the smaller particles from mechanical abrasion. Durable, optically transparent superhydrophobic and oleophobic coatings were developed in 2012 comprising nano particles in the 10 to 100 nm size range.

Research in superhydrophobicity recently accelerated with a letter that reported man-made superhydrophobic samples produced by allowing alkylketene dimer (AKD) to solidify into a nanostructured fractal surface. Many papers have since presented fabrication methods for producing superhydrophobic surfaces including particle deposition, sol-gel techniques, plasma treatments, vapor deposition, and casting techniques. Current opportunity for research impact lies mainly in fundamental research and practical manufacturing. Debates have recently emerged concerning the applicability of the Wenzel and Cassie-Baxter models. In an experiment designed to challenge the surface energy perspective of the Wenzel and Cassie-Baxter model and promote a contact line perspective, water drops were placed on a smooth hydrophobic spot in a rough hydrophobic field, a rough hydrophobic spot in a smooth hydrophobic field, and a hydrophilic spot in a hydrophobic field. Experiments showed that the surface chemistry and geometry at the contact line affected the contact angle and contact angle hysteresis, but the surface area inside the contact line had no effect. An argument that increased jaggedness in the contact line enhances droplet mobility has also been proposed. One method to experimentally measure the jaggedness in the contact line uses low melting temperature metal melted and deposited onto micro/nano structured surfaces. When the metal cools and solidifies, it is removed from the surface, flipped, and inspected for contact line micro geometry.

There have been a few efforts in fabricating a surface with tunable wettability. For the purpose of spontaneous droplet mobility, a surface can be fabricated with varying tower widths and spacings to gradually increase the free energy of the surface. The trend shows that as tower width increases, the free energy barrier becomes larger and the contact angle drops, lowering the hydrophobicity of the material. Increasing tower spacing will increase the contact angle, but also increase the free energy barrier. Droplets naturally move towards areas of weak hydrophobicity, so to make a droplet spontaneously move from one spot to the next, the ideal surface would consist of small width towers with large spacing to large width towers with small spacing. One caveat to this spontaneous motion is the resistance of stationary droplets to move. Initial droplet motion requires an external stimulus, from something as large as a vibration of the surface or as small as a simple syringe "push" as it is released from the needle.

An example of readily tunable wettability is found with special developed fabrics. By stretching a dip-coated commercial fabric, contact angles were typically allowed to increase. This is largely caused by an increase in tower spacing. However, this trend does not continue towards greater hydrophobicity with higher strain. Eventually, the Cassie-Baxter state reaches an instability and transitions to the Wenzel state, soaking the fabric.

An example of a biomimetic superhydrophobic material in nanotechnology is nanopin film. In one study a vanadium pentoxide V_{2}O_{5} surface is presented that can switch reversibly between superhydrophobicity and superhydrophilicity under the influence of UV radiation. According to the study any surface can be modified to this effect by application of a suspension of rose-like V_{2}O_{5} particles for instance with an inkjet printer. Once again hydrophobicity is induced by interlaminar air pockets (separated by 2.1 nm distances). The UV effect is also explained. UV light creates electron-hole pairs, with the holes reacting with lattice oxygen creating surface oxygen vacancies while the electrons reduce V^{5+} to V^{3+}. The oxygen vacancies are met by water and this water absorbency by the vanadium surface makes it hydrophilic. By extended storage in the dark, water is replaced by oxygen and hydrophilicity is once again lost.

Another example of a biomimetic surface includes micro-flowers on common polymer polycarbonates. The micro/nano binary structures (MNBS) imitate the typical micro/nanostructure of a lotus leaf. These micro-flowers offer nanoscale features which enhance the surface's hydrophobicity, without the use of low surface energy coatings. Creation of the superhydrophobic surface through vapor-induced phase separation at varying surrounding relative humidities caused a likewise change to the contact angle of the surface. Surfaces prepared offer contact angles higher than 160° with typical sliding angles around 10°. A recent study has revealed a honeycomb like micro-structures on the taro leaf, which makes the leaf superhydrophobic. The measured contact angle on the taro leaf in this study is around 148 degrees.

Low surface energy coatings can also provide a superhydrophobic surface. A self-assembled monolayer (SAM) coating can provide such surfaces. To maintain a hydrophobic surface, the head groups bind closely to the surface, while the hydrophobic micelles stretch far away from the surface. By varying the amount of SAM you coat on a substrate, one could vary the degree of hydrophobicity. Particular superhydrophobic SAMs have a hydrophobic head group binding to the substrate. In one such work, 1-dodecanethiol (DT; CH_{3}(CH_{2})_{11}SH) is assembled on a Pt/ZnO/SiO_{2} composite substrate, producing contact angles of 170.3°. The monolayers could also be removed with a UV source, decreasing the hydrophobicity. A simple fabrication method could create both microstructure and low surface tension in one step by using octadecyltrichlorosilane (OTS).

Superhydrophobic surfaces are able to stabilize the Leidenfrost effect by making the vapour layer stable. Once the vapour layer is established, cooling never collapses the layer, and no nucleate boiling occurs; the layer instead slowly relaxes until the surface is cooled.

Fabricating superhydrophobic polymer surfaces with controlled geometry can be expensive and time-consuming, but a small number of commercial sources provide specimens for research labs.

== Potential applications ==
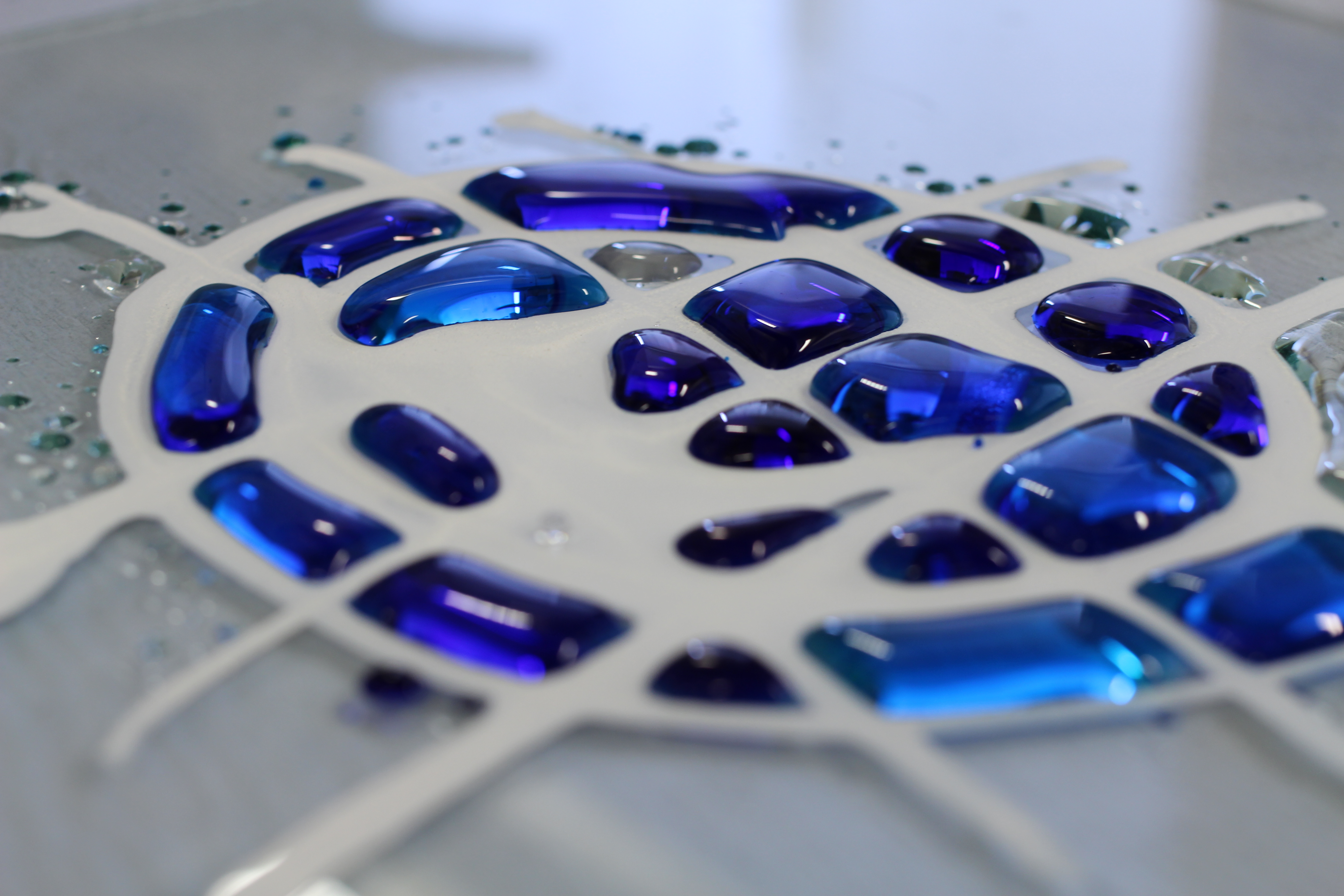
A test of superhydrophobic paint.

Active recent research on superhydrophobic materials might eventually lead to industrial applications. Some attempts at fabricating a superhydrophobic surface include mimicking a lotus leaf surface, namely the two-tiered characteristic. This requires micro-scale surfaces with typically nanoscale features on top of them. For example, a simple routine of coating cotton fabric with silica or titania particles by sol-gel technique has been reported, which protects the fabric from UV light and makes it superhydrophobic. Similarly, silica nanoparticles can be deposited on top of already hydrophobic carbon fabric. The carbon fabric by itself is identified as inherently hydrophobic, but not distinguished as superhydrophobic since its contact angle is not higher than 150°. With the adhesion of silica nanoparticles, contact angles as high as 162° are achieved. Using silica nano-particles is also of interest to develop transparent hydrophobic materials for car windshields and self-cleaning windows. By coating an already transparent surface with nano-silica with about 1 wt%, droplet contact angles can be raised up to 168° with a 12° sliding angle.

An efficient routine has been reported for making linear low-density polyethylene superhydrophobic and thus self-cleaning; 99% of dirt deposited on such a surface is easily washed away. Patterned superhydrophobic surfaces also have the promises for the lab-on-a-chip, microfluidic devices and can drastically improve the surface based bioanalysis. In the textile industry, superhydrophobicity refers to static roll-off angles of water of 20° or less. An example of superhydrophobic effect in live application is the team Alinghi in America's Cup using specially treated sailing jackets. The treatment is built up by micrometre size particles in combination with traditional fluorine chemistry.

There has been a recent development of superhydrophobic paper which has unique properties for its application in paper-based electronics and medical industry. The paper is synthesized in an organic free medium which makes it environmentally friendly. The paper has antimicrobial properties as it does not hold moisture so it makes it useful in surgical applications. This paper could potentially be a breakthrough for the paper-based electronics industry. The resistance to aqueous and organic solvents makes it an ideal choice in developing electronic sensors and chips. Skin based analyte detection is now possible without damaging and continuous replacing of the electrodes as this paper will be immune to sweat.

A recent application of hydrophobic structures and materials is in the development of micro fuel cell chips. Reactions within the fuel cell produce waste gas CO_{2} which can be vented out through these hydrophobic membranes. The membrane consists of many microcavities which allow the gas to escape, while its hydrophobicity characteristic prevents the liquid fuel from leaking through. More fuel flows in to replace the volume previously kept by the waste gas, and the reaction is allowed to continue.

A well-known application of ultrahydrophobic surfaces is on heat exchangers, where they can improve droplet shedding and even cause jumping-droplet condensation, with potential for powerplants, heating and air conditioning, and desalination. Rare earth oxides, which are found to exhibit intrinsically hydrophobic surfaces, offer an alternative to surface coatings, allowing the development of thermally stable hydrophobic surfaces for heat exchangers operating at high temperature Ultrahydrophobic desalination membranes for membrane distillation have also been fabricated for improved fouling resistance, which can be fabricated effectively with chemical vapor deposition.

It has been also suggested that the superhydrophobic surfaces can also repel ice or prevent ice accumulation leading to the phenomenon of icephobicity. However, not every superhydrophobic surface is icephobic and the approach is still under development. In particular, the frost formation over the entire surface is inevitable as a result of undesired inter-droplet freezing wave propagation initiated by the sample edges. Moreover, the frost formation directly results in an increased frost adhesion, posing severe challenges for the subsequent defrosting process. By creating hierarchical surface, the interdroplet freezing wave propagation can be suppressed whereas the ice/frost removal can be promoted. The enhanced performances are mainly owing to the activation of the microscale edge effect in the hierarchical surface, which increases the energy barrier for ice bridging as well as engendering the liquid lubrication during the deicing/defrosting process.

The ability of packaging to fully empty a viscous liquid is somewhat dependent on the surface energy of the inner walls of the container. The use of superhydrophobic surfaces is useful but can be further improved by using new lubricant-impregnated surfaces.

== See also ==
- Contact angle meter
- Hydrophobe
- Hydrophobicity scales
- Lotus effect
- Superhydrophobic coating
