= Wetting =

Ability of a liquid to maintain contact with a solid surface

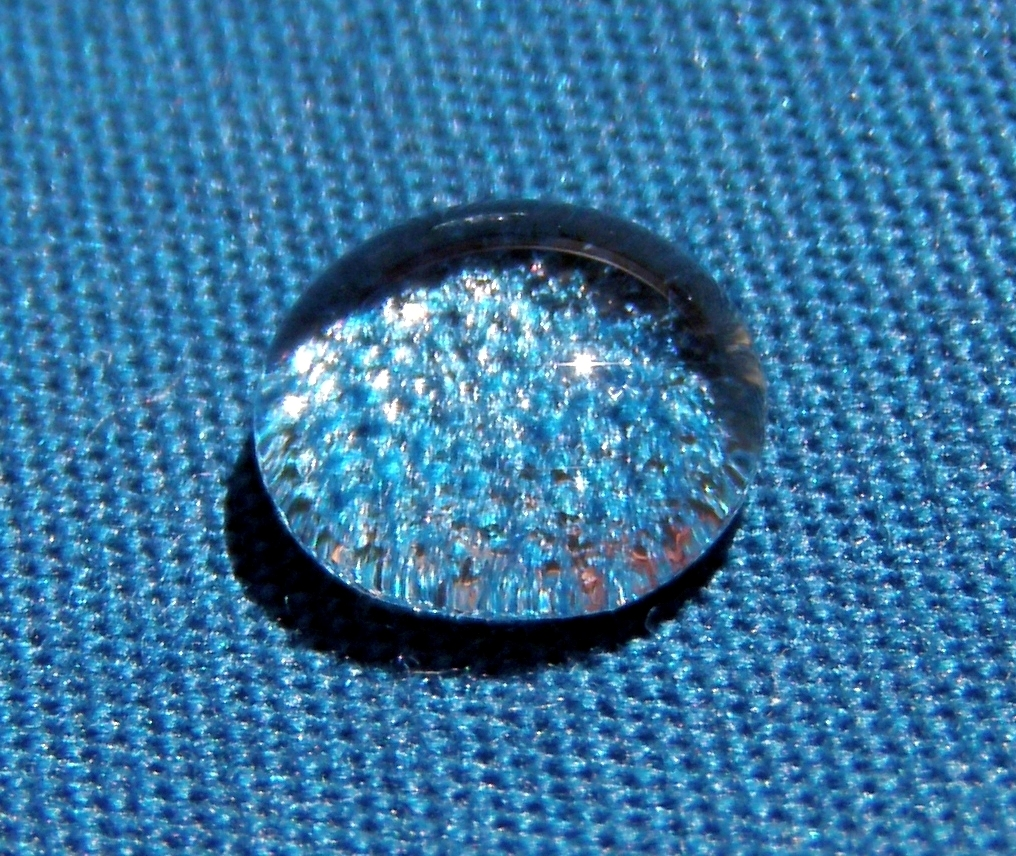
Water bead on a fabric that has been made non-wetting by chemical treatment.

Wetting is the ability of a liquid to maintain contact with a solid surface by displacing another substance or material – either a gas, or other liquid not miscible with the wetting liquid – due to the differential strength of intermolecular interactions with the surface.

The degree of wetting, or wettability, is dependent on the force balance between adhesive and cohesive forces, occurring when liquid and solid make contact in the presence of another physical phase. As such, wetting is of importance to bonding and adherence of substances in different phases.

The wetting power of a liquid, and surface forces contributing to its wettability, are also responsible for capillary action. Surfactants can be used to increase the wetting power of liquids (i.e., water) by reducing surface forces.

There are two types of wetting: non-reactive and reactive wetting.

Wetting has gained increased attention in nanotechnology and nanoscience research following the development of nanomaterials, such as graphene, carbon nanotubes, and boron nitride nanomesh.

== Explanation ==
Figure 1: Contact angle for a liquid droplet on a solid surface

Wetting of a solid material with a liquid substance occurs when adhesive forces allow the liquid (as a droplet) to spread across the surface of the solid at the solid-liquid interface. However, cohesive forces acting on the liquid – at the liquid–vapor interface – counteract the adhesive forces to prevent the droplet from making full contact with the surface.

Fig. 2	Contact angle	Degree of wetting	Interaction strength	
Fig. 2	Contact angle	Degree of wetting	Solid–liquid	Liquid–liquid
S	θ = 0	Perfect wetting	Strong	Weak
C	0 < θ < 90°	High wettability	Strong	Strong
C	0 < θ < 90°	High wettability	Weak	Weak
B	90° ≤ θ < 180°	Low wettability	Weak	Strong
A	θ = 180°	Non-wetting	Weak	Strong

Figure 2: Wetting of different fluids: A shows a fluid with very little wetting, while C shows a fluid with more wetting. A has a large contact angle, and C has a small contact angle.

The contact angle (θ), as seen in Figure 1, is the angle at which the liquid–vapor interface meets the solid–liquid interface, and is determined by the balance between adhesive and cohesive forces. As the tendency of a drop to spread out over a flat, solid surface increases, the contact angle decreases. Thus, the contact angle is used as an inverse measure of wettability.

A contact angle less than 90° (low contact angle) usually indicates that wetting of the surface is very favorable, and the fluid will spread over a large area of the surface. Contact angles greater than 90° (high contact angle) generally mean that wetting of the surface is unfavorable, so the fluid will minimize contact with the surface and form a compact liquid droplet.

For water, a wettable surface may also be termed hydrophilic and a nonwettable surface hydrophobic. Superhydrophobic surfaces have contact angles greater than 150°, showing almost no contact between the liquid drop and the surface. This is sometimes referred to as the "Lotus effect". The table describes varying contact angles and their corresponding solid/liquid and liquid/liquid interactions. For nonwater liquids, the term lyophilic is used for low contact angle conditions and lyophobic is used when higher contact angles result. Similarly, the terms omniphobic and omniphilic apply to both polar and apolar liquids.

=== Molecular energetic perspective of hydrophobicity ===
Recent studies have introduced a quantitative molecular definition of hydrophobicity and wetting transitions, based on the energetic cost required to stabilize hydrogen-bond defects in the hydration shell of a surface or solute. According to this approach, a system is considered hydrophobic if it fails to compensate the energetic penalty of missing hydrogen bonds with an energy at least as favorable as the defect cost in bulk water, estimated around −6 kJ/mol (approximately 30% of a typical hydrogen bond energy). This criterion, known as the Defect Interaction Threshold (DIT), aligns remarkably with the classical 90° contact angle threshold, thus providing a non-arbitrary molecular basis for the onset of hydrophobic behavior. Moreover, by comparing local hydration interactions (such as the weakest and second weakest hydrogen-bond sites of the water molecules, often denoted V_{4S} and V_{3S}) against the DIT, it becomes possible to delineate regimes of full wetting, partial wetting (or partial drying), and complete drying (dewetting). This framework was later extended to macroscopic wetting by defining a molecular wetting coefficient, $\omega_m$, normalized by the DIT. Across chemically diverse surfaces, contact angles collapse onto a single universal master curve when plotted against $\omega_m$, following $\cos \theta \approx \omega_m$, with the transition between wetting and non-wetting behavior occurring exactly at $\omega_m = 0$ (corresponding to the 90° threshold).

== High-energy vs. low-energy surfaces ==
Liquids can interact with two main types of solid surfaces. Traditionally, solid surfaces have been divided into high-energy and low-energy solids. The relative energy of a solid has to do with the bulk nature of the solid itself. Solids such as metals, glasses, and ceramics are known as 'hard solids' because the chemical bonds that hold them together (e.g., covalent, ionic, or metallic) are very strong. Thus, it takes a large amount of energy to break these solids (alternatively, a large amount of energy is required to cut the bulk and make two separate surfaces), so they are termed "high-energy". Most molecular liquids achieve complete wetting with high-energy surfaces.

The other type of solid is weak molecular crystals (e.g., fluorocarbons, hydrocarbons, etc.) where the molecules are held together essentially by physical forces (e.g., van der Waals forces and hydrogen bonds). Since these solids are held together by weak forces, a very low amount of energy is required to break them, thus they are termed "low-energy". Depending on the type of liquid chosen, low-energy surfaces can permit either complete or partial wetting.

Dynamic surfaces have been reported that undergo changes in surface energy upon the application of an appropriate stimuli. For example, a surface presenting photon-driven molecular motors was shown to undergo changes in water contact angle when switched between bistable conformations of differing surface energies.

=== Wetting of low-energy surfaces ===
Low-energy surfaces primarily interact with liquids through dispersive (van der Waals) forces. William Zisman produced several key findings:

Zisman observed that cos θ increases linearly as the surface tension (γ_{LV}) of the liquid decreased. Thus, he was able to establish a linear function between cos θ and the surface tension (γ_{LV}) for various organic liquids.

A surface is more wettable when γ_{LV} and θ is low. Zisman termed the intercept of these lines when cos θ = 1 as the critical surface tension (γ_{c}) of that surface. This critical surface tension is an important parameter because it is a characteristic of only the solid.

Knowing the critical surface tension of a solid, it is possible to predict the wettability of the surface. The wettability of a surface is determined by the outermost chemical groups of the solid. Differences in wettability between surfaces that are similar in structure are due to differences in the packing of the atoms. For instance, if a surface has branched chains, it will have poorer packing than a surface with straight chains. Lower critical surface tension means a less wettable material surface.

== Ideal solid surfaces ==
An ideal surface is flat, rigid, perfectly smooth, chemically homogeneous, and has zero contact angle hysteresis. Zero hysteresis implies the advancing and receding contact angles are equal. In other words, only one thermodynamically stable contact angle exists. When a drop of liquid is placed on such a surface, the characteristic contact angle is formed as depicted in Figure 1. Furthermore, on an ideal surface, the drop will return to its original shape if it is disturbed. The following derivations apply only to ideal solid surfaces; they are only valid for the state in which the interfaces are not moving and the phase boundary line exists in equilibrium.

=== Minimization of energy, three phases ===
Figure 3: Coexistence of three fluid phases in mutual contact; here, α, β, and θ each indicate both a phase and its contact angle.

Figure 4: Neumann's triangle relating the surface energies and contact angles of three fluid phases coexisting in static equilibrium, as depicted in Figure 3

Figure 3 shows the line of contact where three phases meet. In equilibrium, the net force per unit length acting along the boundary line between the three phases must be zero. The components of net force in the direction along each of the interfaces are given by:

$$\begin{align}
\gamma_{\alpha\theta}                        + \gamma_{\theta\beta}\cos\left(\theta\right) + \gamma_{\alpha\beta}\cos\left(\alpha\right) &= 0 \\
\gamma_{\alpha\theta}\cos\left(\theta\right) + \gamma_{\theta\beta}                        + \gamma_{\alpha\beta}\cos\left(\beta\right)  &= 0 \\
\gamma_{\alpha\theta}\cos\left(\alpha\right) + \gamma_{\theta\beta}\cos\left(\beta\right)  + \gamma_{\alpha\beta}                        &= 0
\end{align}$$

where α, β, and θ are the angles shown and γ_{ij} is the surface energy between the two indicated phases. These relations can also be expressed by an analog to a triangle known as Neumann's triangle, shown in Figure 4. Neumann's triangle is consistent with the geometrical restriction that $\alpha + \beta + \theta = 2\pi$, and applying the law of sines and law of cosines to it produce relations that describe how the interfacial angles depend on the ratios of surface energies.

Because these three surface energies form the sides of a triangle, they are constrained by the triangle inequalities, γ_{ij} < γ_{jk} + γ_{ik}, meaning that not one of the surface tensions can exceed the sum of the other two. If three fluids with surface energies that do not follow these inequalities are brought into contact, no equilibrium configuration consistent with Figure 3 will exist.

==== Simplification to planar geometry, Young's relation ====
Figure 5: Contact angle of a liquid droplet wetted to a rigid solid surface

If the β phase is replaced by a flat rigid surface, as shown in Figure 5, then β = π, and the second net force equation simplifies to the Young equation,

$\gamma_\text{SG} = \gamma_\text{SL} + \gamma_\text{LG}\cos\left(\theta\right)$

which relates the surface tensions between the three phases: solid, liquid and gas. Subsequently, this predicts the contact angle of a liquid droplet on a solid surface from knowledge of the three surface energies involved. This equation also applies if the "gas" phase is another liquid, immiscible with the droplet of the first "liquid" phase.

==== Simplification to planar geometry, Young's relation derived from variational computation ====
Consider the interface as a curve $y(x)$ for $x\in I=[0,L]$ where $L$ is a free parameter. The free energy to be minimized is

$${\cal F}[y,L] = \int_0^L \left( \gamma_{LG}\sqrt{1+y'^2} + (\gamma_\text{SL}-\gamma_\text{SG}) \right) dx$$

with the constraints $y(0)=y(L)=0$, which we can write as $\int_I y'dx=0$ and fixed volume $\int_I ydx= A$.

The modified Lagrangian, taking into account the constraints is therefore

$${\cal L} =  \gamma_\text{LG}\sqrt{1+y'^2} + (\gamma_\text{SL}-\gamma_\text{SG}) -\lambda_1 y' - \lambda_2 y$$

where $\lambda_i$ are Lagrange multipliers. By definition, the momentum $p=\partial_{y'}{\cal L}$ and the Hamiltonian ${\cal H} = p y' - {\cal L}$ which is computed to be:

$${\cal H} =  -\gamma_\text{LG}\frac{1}{\sqrt{1+y'^2}} - (\gamma_\text{SL}-\gamma_\text{SG}) + \lambda_2 y$$

Now, we recall that the boundary is free in the $x$ direction and $L$ is a free parameter. Therefore, we must have:

$$\frac{\partial{\cal F}}{\partial L} = -{\cal H} = 0$$

At the boundary $y(L)=0$ and $(1+y'^2)^{-1/2} = \cos\theta$, therefore we recover the Young equation.

==== Non-ideal smooth surfaces and the Young contact angle ====
The Young equation assumes a perfectly flat and rigid surface often referred to as an ideal surface. In many cases, surfaces are far from this ideal situation, and two are considered here: the case of rough surfaces and the case of smooth surfaces that are still real (finitely rigid). Even in a perfectly smooth surface, a drop will assume a wide spectrum of contact angles ranging from the so-called advancing contact angle, $\theta_\mathrm{A}$, to the so-called receding contact angle, $\theta_\mathrm{R}$. The equilibrium contact angle ($\theta_\mathrm{c}$) can be calculated from $\theta_\mathrm{A}$ and $\theta_\mathrm{R}$ as was shown by Tadmor as,

$$\theta_\mathrm{c} = \arccos\left(
\frac{r_\mathrm{A}\cos\left(\theta_\mathrm{A}\right) + r_\mathrm{R}\cos\left(\theta_\mathrm{R}\right)}
{r_\mathrm{A} + r_\mathrm{R}}
\right)$$

where

$$r_\mathrm{A} = \left(
\frac{\sin^3\left(\theta_\mathrm{A}\right)}{2 - 3\cos\left(\theta_\mathrm{A}\right) + \cos^3\left(\theta_\mathrm{A}\right)}
\right)^\frac{1}{3}
~;~~
r_\mathrm{R} = \left(
\frac{\sin^3\left(\theta_\mathrm{R}\right)}{2 - 3\cos\left(\theta_\mathrm{R}\right) + \cos^3\left(\theta_\mathrm{R}\right)}
\right)^\frac{1}{3}$$

Equations for the advancing and receding contact angles have been derived also based on a purely thermodynamic theory

==== Young–Dupré equation and spreading coefficient ====
The Young–Dupré equation (Thomas Young 1805; Anthanase Dupré and Paul Dupré 1869) dictates that neither γ_{SG} nor γ_{SL} can be larger than the sum of the other two surface energies. The consequence of this restriction is the prediction of complete wetting when γ_{SG} > γ_{SL} + γ_{LG} and zero wetting when γ_{SL} > γ_{SG} + γ_{LG}. The lack of a solution to the Young–Dupré equation is an indicator that there is no equilibrium configuration with a contact angle between 0 and 180° for those situations.

A useful parameter for gauging wetting is the spreading parameter S,

$$S = \gamma_\text{SG} - \left(\gamma_\text{SL} + \gamma_\text{LG}\right)$$

When S > 0, the liquid wets the surface completely (complete wetting). When S < 0, partial wetting occurs.

Combining the spreading parameter definition with the Young relation yields the Young–Dupré equation:

$$S = \gamma_\text{LG}\left(\cos\left(\theta\right) - 1\right)$$

which only has physical solutions for θ when S < 0.

==== Generalized model for the contact angle of droplets on flat and curved surfaces ====
With improvements in measuring techniques such as AFM, confocal microscopy and SEM, researchers were able to produce and image droplets at ever smaller scales. With the reduction in droplet size came new experimental observations of wetting. These observations confirm that the modified Young's equation does not hold at the micro-nano scales. In addition the sign of the line tension is not maintained through the modified Young's equation.

For a sessile droplet, the free energy of the three phase system can be expressed as:

$$\delta w = \gamma_\text{LV}dA_\text{LV}+\gamma_\text{SL}dA_\text{SL}+\gamma_\text{SV}dA_\text{SV}-\kappa dL-PdV-VdP$$

At constant volume in thermodynamic equilibrium, this reduces to:

$$0= \frac{dA_\text{LG}}{dA_\text{SL}} + \frac{\gamma_\text{SL}-\gamma_\text{SG}}{\gamma_\text{LG}} - \frac{\kappa}{\gamma_\text{LG}}\frac{dL}{dA_\text{SL}}-\frac{V}{\gamma_\text{LG}} \frac{dP}{dA_\text{SL}}$$

Usually, the VdP term has been neglected for large droplets, however, VdP work becomes significant at small scales. The variation in pressure at constant volume at the free liquid-vapor boundary is due to the Laplace pressure, which is proportional to the mean curvature of the droplet, and is non zero. Solving the above equation for both convex and concave surfaces yields:

$$\cos(\theta\mp\alpha)=A+B\frac{\cos(\alpha)}{a}\pm C\sin(\theta\mp\alpha)(\cos(\theta)+1)^2\biggl(\frac{\sin(\alpha)(\cos(\alpha)+2)}{(\cos(\alpha)+1)^2}\mp\frac{\sin(\theta)(\cos(\theta)+2)}{(\cos(\theta)+1)^2}\biggr),$$

where the constant parameters A, B, and C are defined as:

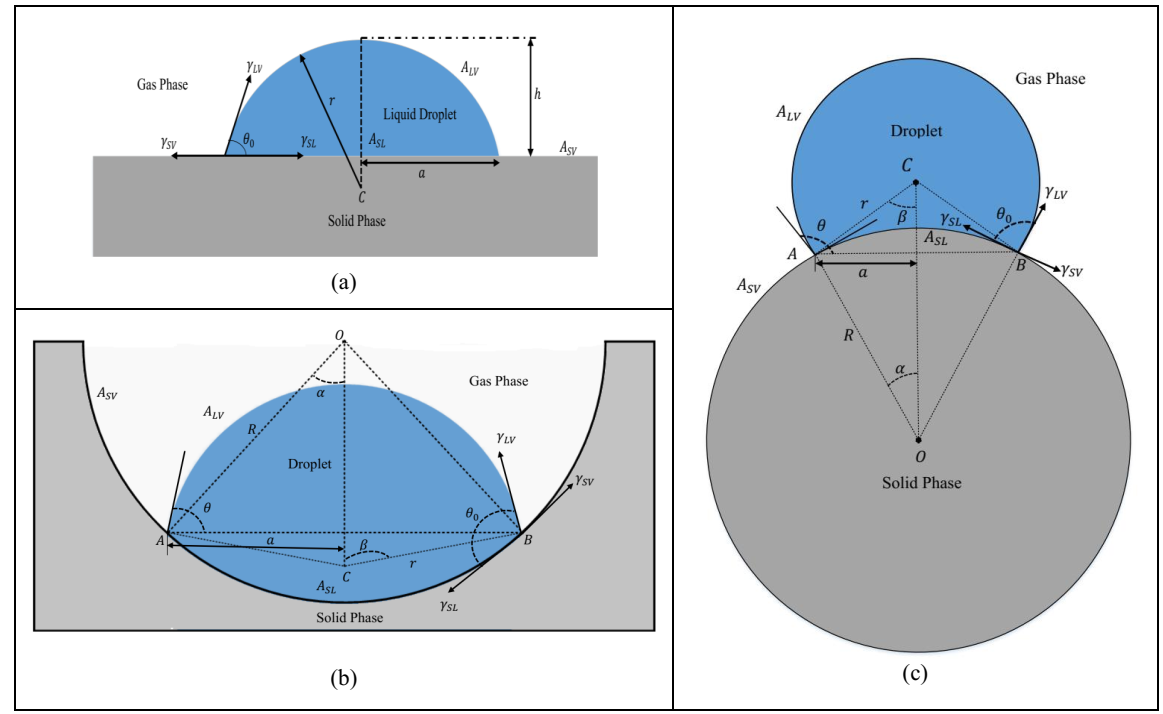
Schematic Diagrams for droplets on flat (a) concave (b) and convex (c) surfaces

$A = \frac{\gamma_\text{SG}-\gamma_\text{SL}}{\gamma_\text{LG}}$, $B = \frac{\kappa}{\gamma_\text{LG}}$ and $C = \frac{\gamma}{3\gamma_\text{LG}}$

This equation relates the contact angle $\theta$, a geometric property of a sessile droplet to the bulk thermodynamics, the energy at the three phase contact boundary, and the curvature of the surface α. For the special case of a sessile droplet on a flat surface (α=0),

$$\cos(\theta) = \frac{\gamma_\text{SG}-\gamma_\text{SL}}{\gamma_{LG}} + \frac{\kappa}{\gamma_\text{LG}} \frac{1}{a} -\frac{\gamma}{3\gamma_\text{LG}}(2+\cos(\theta)-2\cos^2(\theta)-\cos^3(\theta))$$

The first two terms are the modified Young's equation, while the third term is due to the Laplace pressure. This nonlinear equation correctly predicts the sign and magnitude of κ, the flattening of the contact angle at very small scales, and contact angle hysteresis.

=== Computational prediction of wetting ===
For many surface/adsorbate configurations, surface energy data and experimental observations are unavailable. As wetting interactions are of great importance in various applications, it is often desired to predict and compare the wetting behavior of various material surfaces with particular crystallographic orientations, with relation to water or other adsorbates. This can be done from an atomistic perspective with tools including molecular dynamics and density functional theory. In the theoretical prediction of wetting by ab initio approaches such as DFT, ice is commonly substituted for water. This is because DFT calculations are generally conducted assuming conditions of zero thermal movement of atoms, essentially meaning the simulation is conducted at absolute zero. This simplification nevertheless yields results that are relevant for the adsorption of water under realistic conditions and the use of ice for the theoretical simulation of wetting is commonplace.

== Non-ideal rough solid surfaces ==
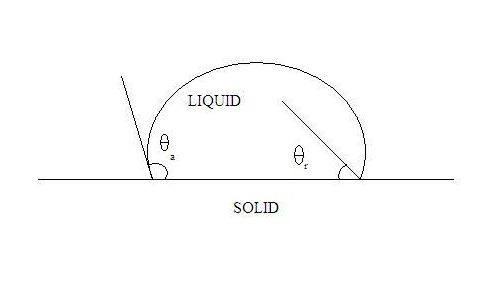
Figure 6: Schematic of advancing and receding contact angles

Unlike ideal surfaces, real surfaces do not have perfect smoothness, rigidity, or chemical homogeneity. Such deviations from ideality result in phenomenon called contact angle hysteresis, which is defined as the difference between the advancing (θ_{a}) and receding (θ_{r}) contact angles

$$\text{H} = \,\theta_{a} - \,\theta_{r}$$

When the contact angle is between the advancing and receding cases, the contact line is considered to be pinned and hysteretic behaviour can be observed, namely contact angle hysteresis. When these values are exceeded, the displacement of the contact line, such as the one in Figure 3, will take place by either expansion or retraction of the droplet. Figure 6 depicts the advancing and receding contact angles. The advancing contact angle is the maximum stable angle, whereas the receding contact angle is the minimum stable angle. Contact angle hysteresis occurs because many different thermodynamically stable contact angles are found on a nonideal solid. These varying thermodynamically stable contact angles are known as metastable states.

Such motion of a phase boundary, involving advancing and receding contact angles, is known as dynamic wetting. The difference between dynamic and static wetting angles is proportional to the capillary number, $Ca$, When a contact line advances, covering more of the surface with liquid, the contact angle is increased and is generally related to the velocity of the contact line. If the velocity of a contact line is increased without bound, the contact angle increases, and as it approaches 180°, the gas phase will become entrained in a thin layer between the liquid and solid. This is a kinetic nonequilibrium effect which results from the contact line moving at such a high speed that complete wetting cannot occur.

A well-known departure from ideal conditions is when the surface of interest has a rough texture. The rough texture of a surface can fall into one of two categories: homogeneous or heterogeneous. A homogeneous wetting regime is where the liquid fills in the grooves of a rough surface. A heterogeneous wetting regime, though, is where the surface is a composite of two types of patches. An important example of such a composite surface is one composed of patches of both air and solid. Such surfaces have varied effects on the contact angles of wetting liquids. Cassie–Baxter and Wenzel are the two main models that attempt to describe the wetting of textured surfaces. However, these equations only apply when the drop size is sufficiently large compared with the surface roughness scale. When the droplet size is comparable to that of the underlying pillars, the effect of line tension should be considered.

=== Wenzel's model ===
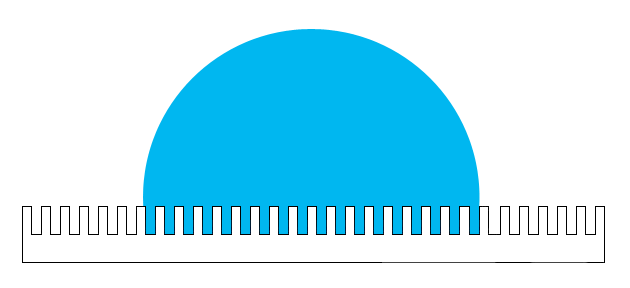
Figure 7: Wenzel model

The Wenzel model describes the homogeneous wetting regime, as seen in Figure 7, and is defined by the following equation for the contact angle on a rough surface:

$$\cos\,\left(\theta^*\right) = r \cos\,\left(\theta\right)$$

where $\theta^*$ is the apparent contact angle which corresponds to the stable equilibrium state (i.e. minimum free energy state for the system). The roughness ratio, r, is a measure of how surface roughness affects a homogeneous surface. The roughness ratio is defined as the ratio of true area of the solid surface to the apparent area.

θ is the contact angle for a system in thermodynamic equilibrium, defined for a perfectly flat surface. Although Wenzel's equation demonstrates the contact angle of a rough surface is different from the intrinsic contact angle, it does not describe contact angle hysteresis.

=== Cassie–Baxter model ===
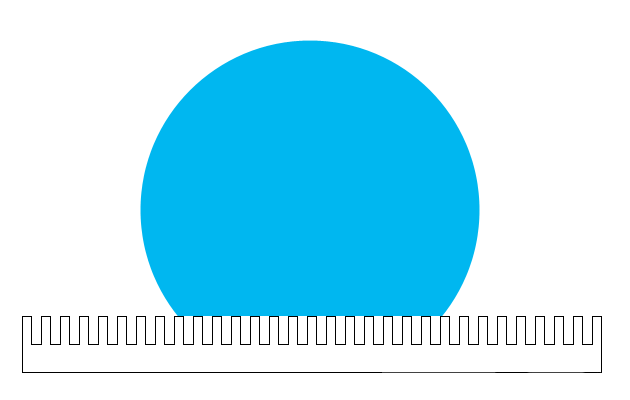
Figure 8: Cassie–Baxter model

When dealing with a heterogeneous surface, the Wenzel model is not sufficient. A more complex model is needed to measure how the apparent contact angle changes when various materials are involved. This heterogeneous surface, like that seen in Figure 8, is explained using the Cassie–Baxter equation (Cassie's law):

$$\cos\,\left(\theta^*\right) = r_f\,f \,\cos\,\left(\theta_\text{Y}\right) + f - 1$$

Here the r_{f} is the roughness ratio of the wet surface area and f is the fraction of solid surface area wet by the liquid. When f = 1 and r_{f} = r, the Cassie–Baxter equations becomes the Wenzel equation. On the other hand, when there are many different fractions of surface roughness, each fraction of the total surface area is denoted by $f_i$.

A summation of all $f_i$ equals 1 or the total surface. Cassie–Baxter can also be recast in the following equation:

$$\gamma\cos\,\left(\theta^*\right) = \sum_{n=1}^N f_i\left(\gamma_\text{i,sv} - \gamma_\text{i,sl}\right)$$

Here $\gamma$ is the Cassie–Baxter surface tension between liquid and vapor, $\gamma_{i,sv}$ is the solid vapor surface tension of every component, and $\gamma_{i,sl}$ is the solid liquid surface tension of every component. A case that is worth mentioning is when the liquid drop is placed on the substrate and creates small air pockets underneath it. This case for a two-component system is denoted by:

$$\gamma\cos\,\left(\theta^*\right) = f_1\left(\gamma_\text{1,sv} - \gamma_\text{1,sl}\right) - \left(1 - f_1\right)\gamma$$

Here the key difference to notice is that there is no surface tension between the solid and the vapor for the second surface tension component. This is because of the assumption that the surface of air that is exposed is under the droplet and is the only other substrate in the system. Subsequently, the equation is then expressed as (1 – f). Therefore, the Cassie equation can be easily derived from the Cassie–Baxter equation. Experimental results regarding the surface properties of Wenzel versus Cassie–Baxter systems showed the effect of pinning for a Young angle of 180 to 90°, a region classified under the Cassie–Baxter model. This liquid/air composite system is largely hydrophobic. After that point, a sharp transition to the Wenzel regime was found where the drop wets the surface, but no further than the edges of the drop. Actually, the Young, Wenzel and Cassie-Baxter equations represent the transversality conditions of the variational problem of wetting.

==== Precursor film ====
With the advent of high resolution imaging, researchers have started to obtain experimental data which have led them to question the assumptions of the Cassie–Baxter equation when calculating the apparent contact angle. These groups believe the apparent contact angle is largely dependent on the triple line. The triple line, which is in contact with the heterogeneous surface, cannot rest on the heterogeneous surface like the rest of the drop. In theory, it should follow the surface imperfection. This bending in the triple line is unfavorable and is not seen in real-world situations. A theory that preserves the Cassie–Baxter equation while at the same time explaining the presence of the minimized energy state of the triple line hinges on the idea of a precursor film. This film of submicrometer thickness advances ahead of the motion of the droplet and is found around the triple line. Furthermore, this precursor film allows the triple line to bend and take different conformations that were originally considered unfavorable. This precursor fluid has been observed using environmental scanning electron microscopy (ESEM) in surfaces with pores formed in the bulk. With the introduction of the precursor film concept, the triple line can follow energetically feasible conformations, thereby correctly explaining the Cassie–Baxter model.

==== Petal effect vs. lotus effect ====
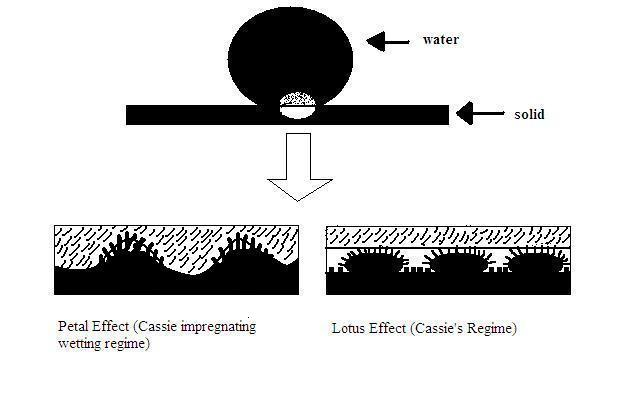
Figure 9: Petal effect vs. lotus effect

The intrinsic hydrophobicity of a surface can be enhanced by being textured with different length scales of roughness. The red rose takes advantage of this by using a hierarchy of micro- and nanostructures on each petal to provide sufficient roughness for superhydrophobicity. More specifically, each rose petal has a collection of micropapillae on the surface and each papilla, in turn, has many nanofolds. The term petal effect describes the fact that a water droplet on the surface of a rose petal is spherical in shape, but cannot roll off even if the petal is turned upside down. The water drops maintain their spherical shape due to the superhydrophobicity of the petal (contact angle of about 152.4°), but do not roll off because the petal surface has a high adhesive force with water.

When comparing the petal effect to the lotus effect, the surface structure of the lotus leaf and the rose petal, as seen in Figure 9, can be used to explain the two different effects.

The lotus leaf has a randomly rough surface and low contact angle hysteresis, which means the water droplet is not able to wet the microstructure spaces between the spikes. This allows air to remain inside the texture, causing a heterogeneous surface composed of both air and solid. As a result, the adhesive force between the water and the solid surface is extremely low, allowing the water to roll off easily (i.e. self-cleaning phenomenon).

The rose petal's micro- and nanostructures are larger in scale than those of the lotus leaf, which allows the liquid film to impregnate the texture. However, as seen in Figure 9, the liquid can enter the larger-scale grooves, but it cannot enter into the smaller grooves. This is known as the Cassie impregnating wetting regime. Since the liquid can wet the larger-scale grooves, the adhesive force between the water and solid is very high. This explains why the water droplet will not fall off even if the petal is tilted at an angle or turned upside down. This effect will fail if the droplet has a volume larger than 10 μL because the balance between weight and surface tension is surpassed.

=== Cassie–Baxter to Wenzel transition ===
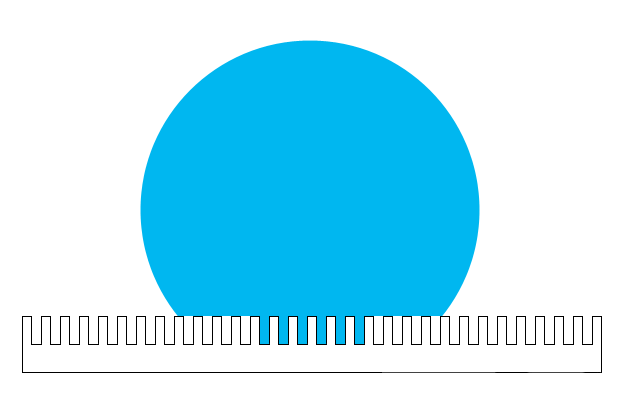
Figure 10: Mushroom state

In the Cassie–Baxter model, the drop sits on top of the textured surface with trapped air underneath. During the wetting transition from the Cassie state to the Wenzel state, the air pockets are no longer thermodynamically stable and liquid begins to nucleate from the middle of the drop, creating a "mushroom state" as seen in Figure 10. The penetration condition is given by:

$$\cos\,\left(\theta_\text{C}\right)= \frac{\phi - 1}{r - \phi}$$

where

- θ_{C} is the critical contact angle
- Φ is the fraction of solid/liquid interface where drop is in contact with surface
- r is solid roughness (for flat surface, r = 1)

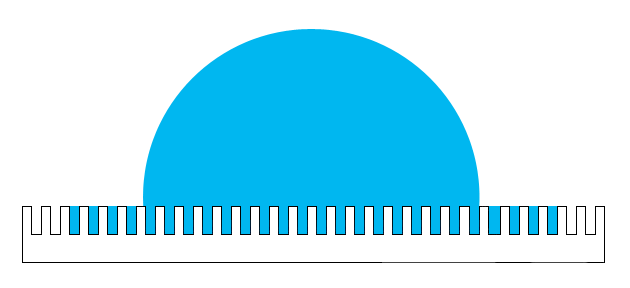
Figure 11: Penetration front spreads beyond drop

The penetration front propagates to minimize the surface energy until it reaches the edges of the drop, thus arriving at the Wenzel state. Since the solid can be considered an absorptive material due to its surface roughness, this phenomenon of spreading and imbibition is called hemiwicking. The contact angles at which spreading/imbibition occurs are between 0 and π/2.

The Wenzel model is valid between θ_{C} and π/2. If the contact angle is less than Θ_{C}, the penetration front spreads beyond the drop and a liquid film forms over the surface. Figure 11 depicts the transition from the Wenzel state to the surface film state. The film smooths the surface roughness and the Wenzel model no longer applies. In this state, the equilibrium condition and Young's relation yields:

$\cos\,\left(\theta^*\right) = \phi\cos\,\left(\theta_C\right) + \left(1 - \phi\right)$

By fine-tuning the surface roughness, it is possible to achieve a transition between both superhydrophobic and superhydrophilic regions. Generally, the rougher the surface, the more hydrophobic it is.

== Spreading dynamics ==
If a drop is placed on a smooth, horizontal surface, it is generally not in the equilibrium state. Hence, it spreads until an equilibrium contact radius is reached (partial wetting). While taking into account capillary, gravitational, and viscous contributions, the drop radius as a function of time can be expressed as

$$r(t) = r_e\left[
1 - \exp\left(-\left(\frac{2\gamma_{LG}}{r^{12}_e} + \frac{\rho g}{9r^{10}_e}\right)\frac{24\lambda V^4 \left(t + t_0\right)}{\pi^2\eta}\right)
\right]^\frac{1}{6}.$$

For the complete wetting situation, the drop radius at any time during the spreading process is given by

$$r(t) = \left[
\left(\gamma_{LG} \frac{96\lambda V^4}{\pi^2 \eta} \left(t + t_0\right)\right)^\frac{1}{2} +
\left(\frac{\lambda(t + t_0)}{\eta}\right)^\frac{2}{3} \frac{24\rho g V^\frac{8}{3}}{7 \cdot 96^\frac{1}{3} \pi^\frac{4}{3} \gamma_{LG}^\frac{1}{3}}
\right]^\frac{1}{6},$$

where

- γ_{LG} is surface tension of the fluid
- V is drop volume
- η is viscosity of the fluid
- ρ is density of the fluid
- g is gravitational constant
- λ is shape factor, 37.1 m^{−1}
- t_{0} is experimental delay time
- r_{e} is drop radius in equilibrium

== Modifying wetting properties ==
=== Surfactants ===
Many technological processes require control of liquid spreading over solid surfaces. When a drop is placed on a surface, it can completely wet, partially wet, or not wet the surface. By reducing the surface tension with surfactants, a nonwetting material can be made to become partially or completely wetting. The excess free energy (σ) of a drop on a solid surface is:

$\sigma = \gamma S + PV + \pi\,R^2 \left(\gamma_\text{SL} - \gamma_\text{SV}\right)$
- γ is the liquid–vapor interfacial tension
- γ_{SL} is the solid–liquid interfacial tension
- γ_{SV} is the solid–vapor interfacial tension
- S is the area of liquid–vapor interface
- P is the excess pressure inside liquid
- R is the radius of droplet base

Based on this equation, the excess free energy is minimized when γ decreases, γ_{SL} decreases, or γ_{SV} increases. Surfactants are absorbed onto the liquid–vapor, solid–liquid, and solid–vapor interfaces, which modify the wetting behavior of hydrophobic materials to reduce the free energy. When surfactants are absorbed onto a hydrophobic surface, the polar head groups face into the solution with the tail pointing outward. In more hydrophobic surfaces, surfactants may form a bilayer on the solid, causing it to become more hydrophilic. The dynamic drop radius can be characterized as the drop begins to spread. Thus, the contact angle changes based on the following equation:

$\cos\,\left(\theta(t)\right) = \cos\,\left(\theta_0\right) + \left(\cos\,\left(\theta_\infty\right) - \cos\,\left(\theta_0\right)\right)\left(1 - e^{-\frac{t}{\tau}}\right)$
- θ_{0} is initial contact angle
- θ_{∞} is final contact angle
- τ is the surfactant transfer time scale

As the surfactants are absorbed, the solid–vapor surface tension increases and the edges of the drop become hydrophilic. As a result, the drop spreads.

=== Surface changes ===
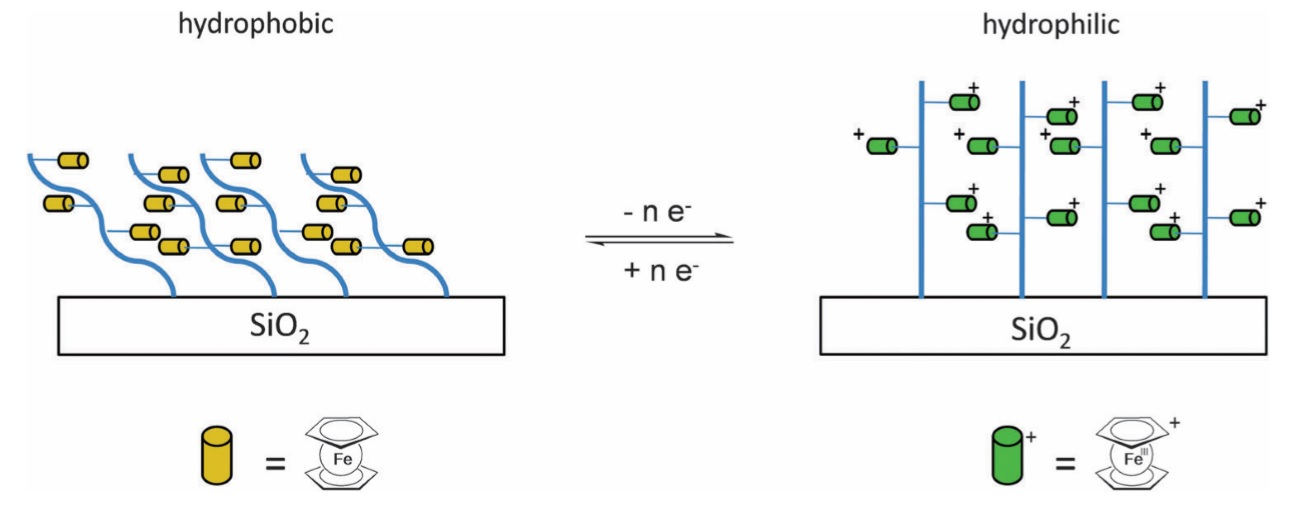
Strands of an uncharged ferrocene-substituted polymer are tethered to a hydrophobic silica surface. Oxidation of the ferrocenyl groups produces a hydrophilic surface due to electrostatic attractions between the resulting charges and the polar solvent.

Ferrocene is a redox-active organometallic compound which can be incorporated into various monomers and used to make polymers which can be tethered onto a surface. Vinylferrocene (ferroceneylethene) can be prepared by a Wittig reaction and then polymerized to form polyvinylferrocene (PVFc), an analog of polystyrene. Another polymer which can be formed is poly(2-(methacryloyloxy)ethyl ferrocenecarboxylate), PFcMA. Both PVFc and PFcMA have been tethered onto silica wafers and the wettability measured when the polymer chains are uncharged and when the ferrocene moieties are oxidised to produce positively charged groups, as illustrated at right. The contact angle with water on the PFcMA-coated wafers was 70° smaller following oxidation, while in the case of PVFc the decrease was 30°, and the switching of wettability has been shown to be reversible. In the PFcMA case, the effect of longer chains with more ferrocene groups (and also greater molar mass) has been investigated, and it was found that longer chains produce significantly larger contact angle reductions.

=== Oxygen vacancies ===
Rare earth oxides exhibit intrinsic hydrophobicity, and hence can be used in thermally stable heat exchangers and other applications involving high-temperature hydrophobicity. The presence of oxygen vacancies at surfaces of ceria or other rare earth oxides is instrumental in governing surface wettability. Adsorption of water at oxide surfaces can occur as molecular adsorption, in which H_{2}O molecules remain intact at the terminated surface, or as dissociative adsorption, in which OH and H are adsorbed separately at solid surfaces. The presence of oxygen vacancies is generally found to enhance hydrophobicity while promoting dissociative adsorption.

== See also ==
- Adsorption – Phenomenon of surface adhesion
- Amott test
- Anti-fog – Chemicals that prevent the condensation of water as small droplets on a surface
- Contact angle – Angle between a liquid–vapor interface and a solid surface
- Dewetting – Retraction of a fluid from a surface it was forced to cover
- Electrowetting – Physical process
- Flotation – Upward force that opposes the weight of an object immersed in fluid
- Hydrophobe – Molecule or surface that has no attraction to water
- Sessile drop technique – Method of determining the surface energy of a solid
- Soap bubble – Thin film of soapy water enclosing air
- Rise in core – Lab technique
- Wetting current – Minimum electric current through a contact to break through the surface film resistance
- Wetting voltage – Minimum electric current through a contact to break through the surface film resistance
- Lak wettability index
- USBM wettability index
