= Self-cleaning glass =

Material

Self-cleaning glass is a specific type of glass with a surface that keeps itself free of dirt and grime.

The field of self-cleaning coatings on glass is divided into two categories: hydrophobic and hydrophilic. These two types of coating both clean themselves through the action of water, the former by rolling droplets and the latter by sheeting water that carries away dirt. Hydrophilic coatings based on titania (titanium dioxide), however, have an additional property: they can chemically break down absorbed dirt in sunlight.

The requirements for a self-cleaning hydrophobic surface are a very high static water contact angle θ, the condition often quoted is θ > 160°, and a very low roll-off angle, i.e. the minimum inclination angle necessary for a droplet to roll off the surface.

== Self-cleaning surfaces ==
Several techniques are known for the patterning of hydrophobic surfaces through the use of moulded polymers and waxes, by physical processing methods such as ion etching and compression of polymer beads, and by chemical methods such as plasma-chemical roughening, which can all result in ultra-hydrophobic coatings. While these surfaces are effective self-cleaners, they suffer from a number of drawbacks which have so far prevented widespread application. Batch processing a hydrophobic material is a costly and time-consuming technique, and the coatings produced are usually hazy, precluding applications on lenses and windows, and fragile materials. The second class of self-cleaning surfaces are hydrophilic surfaces which do not rely solely on the flow of water to wash away dirt. These coatings chemically break down dirt when exposed to light, a process known as photocatalysis. Despite the commercialization of a hydrophilic self-cleaning coating in a number of products, the field is far from mature; investigations into the fundamental mechanisms of self-cleaning and characterizations of new coatings are regularly published in the primary literature.

== Discovery of self-cleaning behavior ==
The first self-cleaning glass was based on a thin film titania coating. The film can be applied by spin coating of organo-titanate chelated precursor (for example titanium iso-tetrapropoxide chelated by acetylacetone), followed by heat treatment at elevated temperatures to burn the organic residues and to form the anatase phase. In that case, sodium might diffuse from the glass into the nascent titanium dioxide, causing a degradation in the hydrophilic/catalytic effect unless preventive measures are taken. The glass cleans itself in two stages. The photocatalytic stage of the process breaks down the organic dirt on the glass using ultraviolet light and makes the glass superhydrophilic (normally glass is hydrophobic). During the following superhydrophilic stage, rain washes away the dirt, leaving almost no streaks, because water spreads evenly on superhydrophilic surfaces.

=== First commercial product ===
In 2001, Pilkington Glass announced the development of the first self-cleaning windows, Pilkington Activ™, and in the following months several other major glass companies released similar products. As a result, glazing is perhaps the largest commercial application of self-cleaning coatings to date. All of these windows are coated with a thin transparent layer of titanium dioxide. This coating acts to clean the window in two stages, using two distinct properties: photocatalysis and hydrophilicity. In sunlight, photocatalysis causes the coating to chemically break down organic dirt adsorbed onto the window. When the glass is wet by rain or other water, hydrophilicity reduces contact angles to very low values, causing the water to form a thin layer rather than droplets, and this layer washes dirt away.

== Use of titanium dioxide in self-cleaning applications ==
Titanium dioxide has become the material of choice for self-cleaning windows, and hydrophilic self-cleaning surfaces in general, because of its favorable physical and chemical properties. Not only is titanium dioxide highly efficient at photocatalysing dirt in sunlight and reaching the superhydrophilic state, it is also non-toxic, chemically inert in the absence of light, inexpensive, relatively easy to handle and deposit into thin films and is an established household chemical that is used as a pigment in cosmetics and paint and as a food additive.

=== Mechanism ===
The metastable anatase phase is generally considered to be the most photocatalytic among the polymorphic structures of titanium, possibly as the result of a typically higher specific surface area. Moreover, ultraviolet irradiation creates surface oxygen vacancies at bridging sites, resulting in the conversion of relevant Ti^{4+} sites to Ti^{3+} sites which are favourable for dissociative water adsorption. These defects presumably influence the affinity to chemisorbed water of their surrounding sites, forming hydrophilic domains, whereas the rest of the surface remains oleophilic. Hydrophilic domains are areas where dissociative water is adsorbed, associated with oxygen vacancies that are preferentially photogenerated along the [001] direction of the (110) plane; the same direction in which oxygen bridging sites align.

== Other applications ==
Other possible application areas are computer monitors and PDA screens, where fingerprints are undesirable.

Titanium dioxide–based glass cannot decompose thick non-transparent deposits, such as paint or silicone, waterstop fingerprints or bleeding after weathering, or stucco dust produced during construction.

Since 2001 the TC24 "Coatings on Glass" committee International Commission on Glass has been trying to set up test methods for evaluation of photocatalytic self-cleaning coatings on glass.

== Brands ==
- The Pilkington Activ brand by Pilkington is claimed by the company to be the first self-cleaning glass. Pilkington Activ™ consists of a 20–30 nm layer of nanocrystalline anatase titanium dioxide deposited by an atmospheric pressure chemical vapor deposition technique onto soda-lime silicate float glass. The result is a product with extremely favourable visible transmission and reflectance properties; Activ™ has a visible reflectance of around 7% and a visible haze of less than 1%, but absorbs 20% of incident solar UV light which is used in the self-cleaning process. The coating is also robust and cannot be damaged by application of Scotch tape or moderate mechanical abrasion; Pilkington claim that the coating will last the lifetime of the window frame.
- The SunClean brand by PPG Industries also uses a coating of titanium dioxide, applied by a patented process.
- Neat Glass by Cardinal Glass Industries has a titanium dioxide layer less than 10 nm thick applied by magnetron sputtering.
- SGG Aquaclean (1st generation, hydrophilic only, 2002) and Bioclean (2nd generation, both photoactive and hydrophilic, 2003) by Saint-Gobain. The Bioclean coating is applied by chemical vapor deposition.
- REIBORG HIKARI by Nippon Sheet Glass.
- Rain-X

== See also ==
- ETFE films, transparent polymer films described as self-cleaning
