= Cassie's law =

Physical law in fluid mechanics

Cassie's law, or the Cassie equation, describes the effective contact angle θ_{c} for a liquid on a chemically heterogeneous surface, i.e. the surface of a composite material consisting of different chemistries, that is, non-uniform throughout. Contact angles are important as they quantify a surface's wettability, the nature of solid-fluid intermolecular interactions. Cassie's law is reserved for when a liquid completely covers both smooth and rough heterogeneous surfaces.

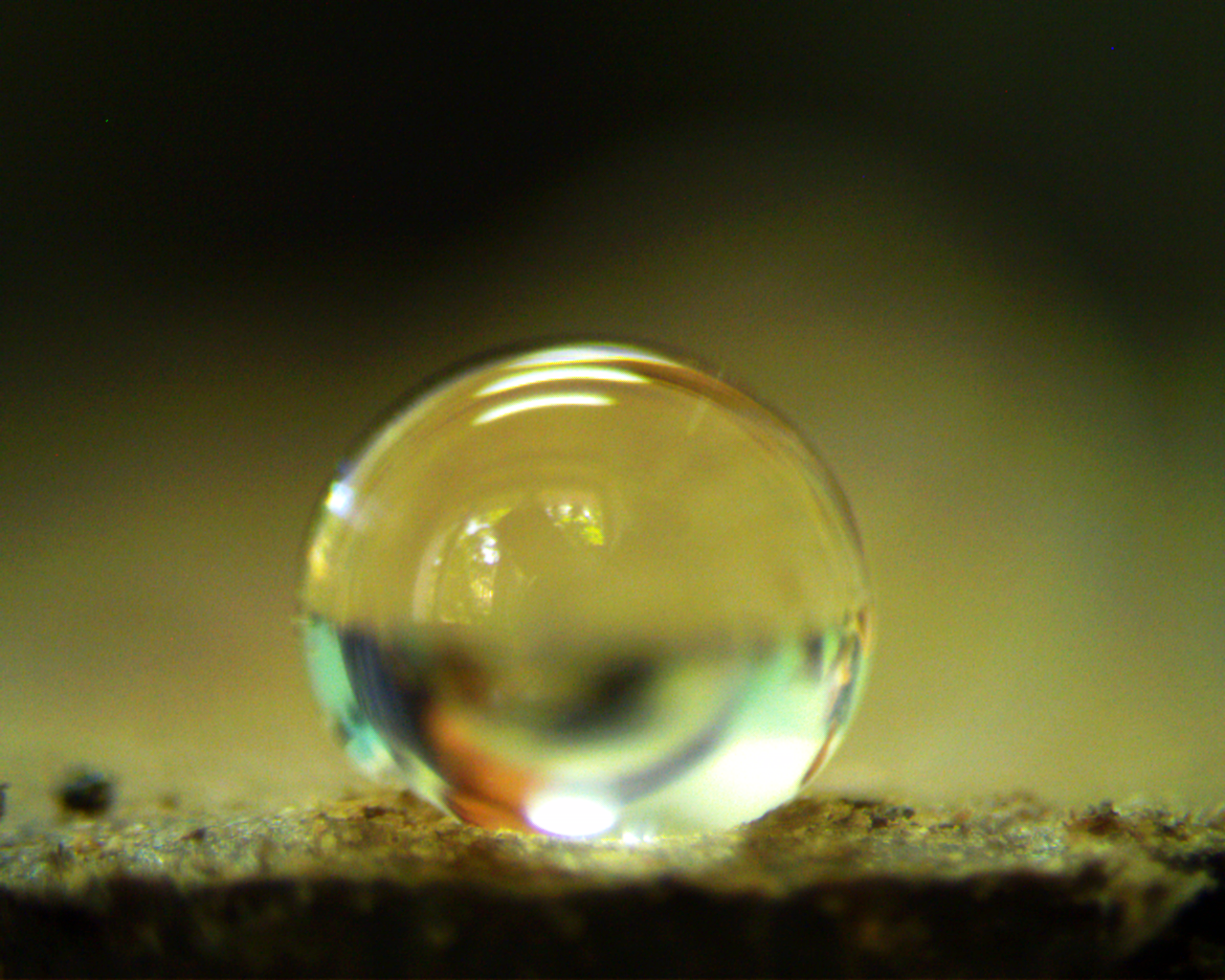
Cassie-Baxter state. A water droplet resting on a heterogeneous surface (sand), forms a contact angle, here $\theta_c = 145.22^\circ$

More of a rule than a law, the formula found in literature for two materials is;

$\cos \theta_c = \sigma_1 \cos \theta_1 + \sigma_2 \cos \theta_2$

where $\theta_1$and $\theta_2$ are the contact angles for components 1 with fractional surface area $\sigma_1$, and 2 with fractional surface area $\sigma_2$ in the composite material respectively. If there exist more than two materials then the equation is scaled to the general form of;

$\cos \theta_{c} =\sum_{k=1}^N \sigma_k \cos \theta_k$, with $\sum_{k=1}^N \sigma_k = 1$.

== Cassie-Baxter ==
Cassie's law takes on special meaning when the heterogeneous surface is a porous medium. $\sigma_1$ now represents the solid surface area and $\sigma_2$ air gaps, such that the surface is no longer completely wet. Air creates a contact angle of $180^\circ$and because $\cos(180)$= $-1$, the equation reduces to:

$\cos \theta_{cb} =\sigma_1 \cos \theta_1 - \sigma_2$, which is the Cassie-Baxter equation.

Unfortunately the terms Cassie and Cassie-Baxter are often used interchangeably but they should not be confused. The Cassie-Baxter equation is more common in nature, and focuses on the 'incomplete coating' of surfaces by a liquid only. In the Cassie-Baxter state liquids sit upon asperities, resulting in air pockets that are bounded between the surface and liquid.

== Homogeneous surfaces ==
The Cassie-Baxter equation is not restricted to only chemically heterogeneous surfaces, as air within porous homogeneous surfaces will make the system heterogeneous. However, if the liquid penetrates the grooves, the surface returns to homogeneity and neither of the previous equations can be used. In this case the liquid is in the Wenzel state, governed by a separate equation. Transitions between the Cassie-Baxter state and the Wenzel state can take place when external stimuli such as pressure or vibration are applied to the liquid on the surface.

== Equation origin ==
When a liquid droplet interacts with a solid surface, its behaviour is governed by surface tension and energy. The liquid droplet could spread indefinitely or it could sit on the surface like a spherical cap at which point there exists a contact angle.

Defining $E$ as the free energy change per unit area caused by a liquid spreading,

$E= \sigma_1(\gamma_{s_1a}-\gamma_{s_1l} ) +\sigma_2(\gamma_{s_2a}-\gamma_{s_2l} )$

where $\sigma_1$, $\sigma_2$are the fractional areas of the two materials on the heterogeneous surface, and $\gamma_{sa}$and $\gamma_{sl}$the interfacial tensions between solid, air and liquid.

The contact angle for the heterogeneous surface is given by,

$\cos \theta_c =\frac{E}{\gamma_{la}}$, with $\gamma_{la}$the interfacial tension between liquid and air.

The contact angle given by the Young equation is,

$cos \theta _y=\frac{\gamma_{sa}- \gamma_{sl}}{\gamma_{la}}$

Thus by substituting the first expression into Young's equation, we arrive at Cassie's law for heterogeneous surfaces,

$\cos \theta_c = \sigma_1 \cos \theta_1 + \sigma_2 \cos \theta_2$

== History behind Cassie's law ==
=== Young's law ===
Studies concerning the contact angle existing between a liquid and a solid surface began with Thomas Young in 1805. The Young equation

$cos \theta_y=\frac{\gamma_{sa}- \gamma_{sl}}{\gamma_{la}}$

Different contact angle scenarios

reflects the relative strength of the interaction between surface tensions at the three phase contact, and is the geometric ratio between the energy gained in forming a unit area of the solid–liquid interface to that required to form a liquid–air interface. However Young's equation only works for ideal and real surfaces and in practice most surfaces are microscopically rough.

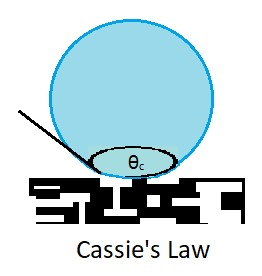
Cassie's law

=== Wenzel state ===
In 1936 Young's equation was modified by Robert Wenzel to account for rough homogeneous surfaces, and a parameter $r$ was introduced, defined as the ratio of the true area of the solid compared to its nominal. Known as the Wenzel equation,

$\cos \theta_w = r \cos \theta_y$

shows that the apparent contact angle, the angle measured at casual inspection, will increase if the surface is roughened. Liquids with contact angle $\theta _w$are known to be in the Wenzel state.

=== Cassie-Baxter state ===
The notion of roughness effecting the contact angle was extended by Cassie and Baxter in 1944 when they focused on porous mediums, where liquid does not penetrate the grooves on rough surface and leaves air gaps. They devised the Cassie-Baxter equation;

$\cos \theta_c =\sigma_1 \cos \theta_1 - \sigma_2$, sometimes written as $\cos \theta_c =\sigma_1 ( \cos \theta_1 +1)-1$ where the $\sigma_2$ has become $(1- \sigma_1)$.

=== Cassie's Law ===
In 1948 Cassie refined this for two materials with different chemistries on both smooth and rough surfaces, resulting in the aforementioned Cassie's law

$\cos \theta_c = \sigma_1 \cos \theta_1 + \sigma_2 \cos \theta_2$

=== Arguments and inconsistencies ===
Following the discovery of superhydrophobic surfaces in nature and the growth of their application in industry, the study of contact angles and wetting has been widely reexamined. Some claim that Cassie's equations are more fortuitous than fact with it being argued that emphasis should not be placed on fractional contact areas but actually the behaviour of the liquid at the three phase contact line. They do not argue never using the Wenzel and Cassie-Baxter's equations but that “they should be used with knowledge of their faults”. However the debate continues, as this argument was evaluated and criticised with the conclusion being drawn that contact angles on surfaces can be described by the Cassie and Cassie-Baxter equations provided the surface fraction and roughness parameters are reinterpreted to take local values appropriate to the droplet. This is why Cassie's law is actually more of a rule.

== Examples ==
It is widely agreed that the water repellency of biological objects is due to the Cassie-Baxter equation. If water has a contact angle between $0< \theta <90^\circ$, then the surface is classed as hydrophilic, whereas a surface producing a contact angle between $90^ \circ< \theta <180^ \circ$ is hydrophobic. In the special cases where the Contact angle is $150^ \circ< \theta$, then it is known as superhydrophobic.

=== Lotus Effect ===
One example of a superhydrophobic surface in nature is the Lotus leaf. Lotus leaves have a typical contact angle of $\theta \sim 160 ^\circ$, ultra low water adhesion due to minimal contact areas, and a self cleaning property which is characterised by the Cassie-Baxter equation. The microscopic architecture of the Lotus leaf means that water will not penetrate nanofolds on the surface, leaving air pockets below. The water droplets become suspended in the Cassie-Baxter state and are able to roll off the leaf picking up dirt as they do so, thus cleaning the leaf.

=== Feathers ===
The Cassie–Baxter wetting regime also explains the water repellent features of the pennae (feathers) of a bird. The feather consists of a topographic network of 'barbs and barbules' and a droplet that is deposited on a these resides in a solid-liquid-air non-wetting composite state, where tiny air pockets are trapped within.

== See also ==
- Wetting
- Ultrahydrophobicity
- Contact angle
- Goniometer
- Droplet
- Lotus effect
