= Superhydrophilicity =

Superhydrophilicity refers to the phenomenon of excess hydrophilicity, or attraction to water; in superhydrophilic materials, the contact angle of water is equal to zero degrees. This effect was discovered in 1995 by the Research Institute of Toto Ltd. for titanium dioxide irradiated by sunlight. Under light irradiation, water dropped onto titanium dioxide forms no contact angle (almost 0 degrees).

Superhydrophilic material has various advantages. For example, it can defog glass, and it can also enable oil spots to be swept away easily with water. Such materials are already commercialized as door mirrors for cars, coatings for buildings, self-cleaning glass, etc.

Several mechanisms of this superhydrophilicity have been proposed by researchers. One is the change of the surface structure to a metastable structure, and another is cleaning the surface by the photodecomposition of dirt such as organic compounds adsorbed on the surface, after either of which water molecules can adsorb to the surface. The mechanism is still controversial, and it is too soon to decide which suggestion is correct. To decide, atomic scale measurements and other studies will be necessary.

== See also ==
- Superhydrophobicity, the opposite phenomenon
