= Lotus effect =

Self-cleaning properties

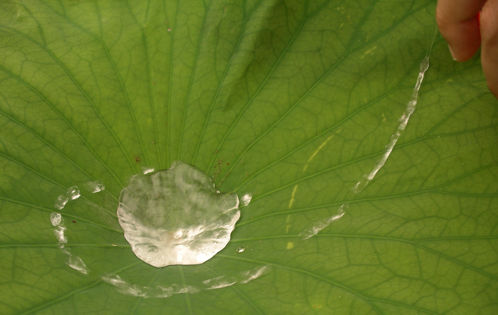
Water on the surface of a lotus leaf

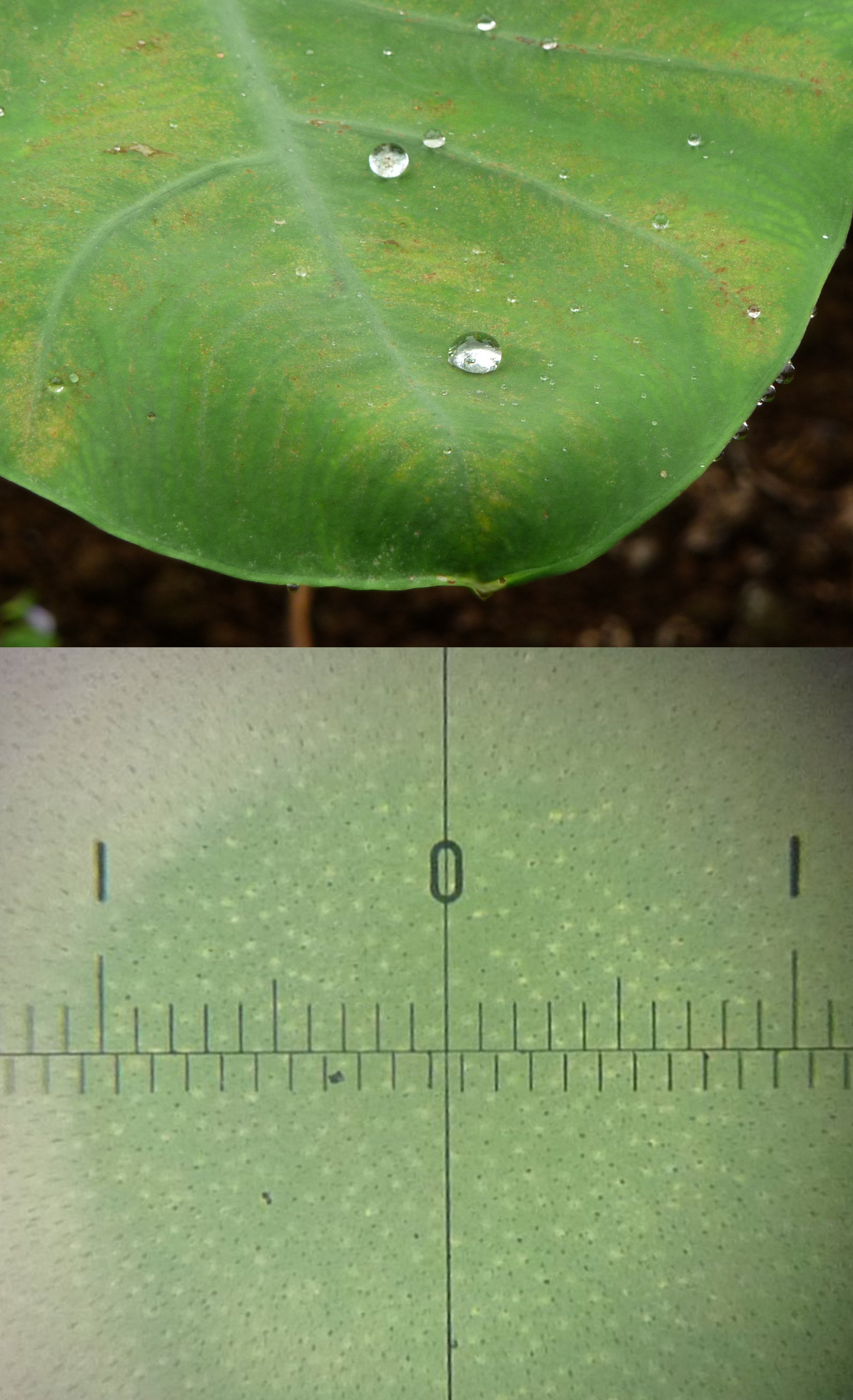
Water droplets on taro leaf with lotus effect (upper), and taro leaf surface magnified (0–1 is one millimetre span) showing a number of small protrusions (lower).

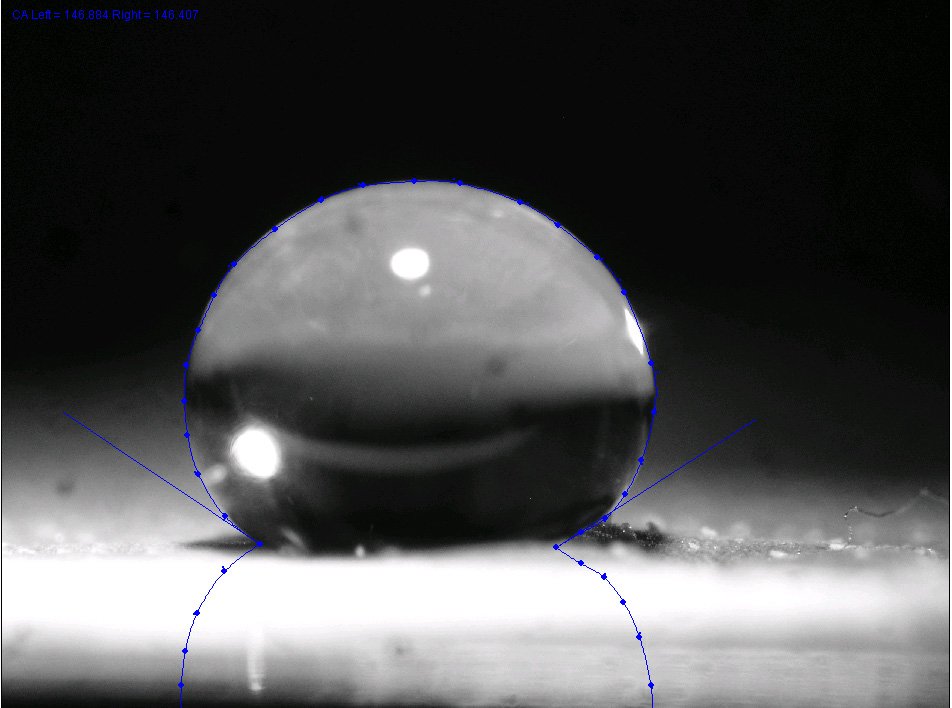
A water drop on a lotus surface showing contact angles of approximately 147°

The lotus effect refers to self-cleaning properties that are a result of ultrahydrophobicity as exhibited by the leaves of Nelumbo, the lotus flower. Dirt particles are picked up by water droplets due to the micro- and nanoscopic architecture on the surface, which minimizes the droplet's adhesion to that surface. Ultrahydrophobicity and self-cleaning properties are also found in other plants, such as Tropaeolum (nasturtium), Opuntia (prickly pear), Alchemilla, cane, and also on the wings of certain insects.

The phenomenon of ultrahydrophobicity was first studied by Dettre and Johnson in 1964 using rough hydrophobic surfaces. Their work developed a theoretical model based on experiments with glass beads coated with paraffin or PTFE telomer. The self-cleaning property of ultrahydrophobic micro-nanostructured surfaces was studied by Wilhelm Barthlott and Ehler in 1977, who described such self-cleaning and ultrahydrophobic properties for the first time as the "lotus effect"; perfluoroalkyl and perfluoropolyether ultrahydrophobic materials were developed by Brown in 1986 for handling chemical and biological fluids. Other biotechnical applications have emerged since the 1990s.

== Functional principle ==
The high surface tension of water causes droplets to assume a nearly spherical shape, since a sphere has minimal surface area, and this shape therefore minimizes the solid-liquid surface energy. On contact of liquid with a surface, adhesion forces result in wetting of the surface. Either complete or incomplete wetting may occur depending on the structure of the surface and the surface tension of the droplet. The cause of self-cleaning properties is the hydrophobic water-repellent double structure of the surface. This enables the contact area and the adhesion force between surface and droplet to be significantly reduced, resulting in a self-cleaning process. This hierarchical double structure is formed out of a characteristic epidermis (its outermost layer called the cuticle) and the covering waxes. The epidermis of the lotus plant possesses papillae 10 μm to 20 μm in height and 10 μm to 15 μm in width on which the so-called epicuticular waxes are imposed. These superimposed waxes are hydrophobic and form the second layer of the double structure. This system regenerates. This biochemical property is responsible for the functioning of the water repellency of the surface.

The hydrophobicity of a surface can be measured by its contact angle. The higher the contact angle the higher the hydrophobicity of a surface. Surfaces with a contact angle < 90° are referred to as hydrophilic and those with an angle >90° as hydrophobic. Some plants show contact angles up to 160° and are called ultrahydrophobic, meaning that only 2–3% of the surface of a droplet (of typical size) is in contact. Plants with a double structured surface like the lotus can reach a contact angle of 170°, whereby the droplet's contact area is only 0.6%. All this leads to a self-cleaning effect.

Dirt particles with an extremely reduced contact area are picked up by water droplets and are thus easily cleaned off the surface. If a water droplet rolls across such a contaminated surface the adhesion between the dirt particle, irrespective of its chemistry, and the droplet is higher than between the particle and the surface. This cleaning effect has been demonstrated on common materials such as stainless steel when a superhydrophobic surface is produced. As this self-cleaning effect is based on the high surface tension of water it does not work with organic solvents. Therefore, the hydrophobicity of a surface is no protection against graffiti.

This effect is of great importance for plants as a protection against pathogens like fungi or algae growth, and also for animals like butterflies, dragonflies and other insects not able to cleanse all their body parts. Another positive effect of self-cleaning is the prevention of contamination of the area of a plant surface exposed to light resulting in reduced photosynthesis.

== Technical application ==
When it was discovered that the self-cleaning qualities of ultrahydrophobic surfaces come from physical-chemical properties at the microscopic to nanoscopic scale rather than from the specific chemical properties of the leaf surface, the possibility arose of using this effect in manmade surfaces, by mimicking nature in a general way rather than a specific one.

Some nanotechnologists have developed treatments, coatings, paints, roof tiles, fabrics and other surfaces that can stay dry and clean themselves by replicating in a technical manner the self-cleaning properties of plants, such as the lotus plant. This can usually be achieved using special fluorochemical or silicone treatments on structured surfaces or with compositions containing micro-scale particulates.

In addition to chemical surface treatments, which can be removed over time, metals have been sculpted with femtosecond pulse lasers to produce the lotus effect. The materials are uniformly black at any angle, which combined with the self-cleaning properties might produce very low maintenance solar thermal energy collectors, while the high durability of the metals could be used for self-cleaning latrines to reduce disease transmission.

Further applications have been marketed, such as self-cleaning glasses installed in the sensors of traffic control units on German autobahns developed by a cooperation partner (Ferro GmbH). The Swiss companies HeiQ and Schoeller Textil have developed stain-resistant textiles under the brand names "HeiQ Eco Dry" and "nanosphere" respectively. In October 2005, tests of the Hohenstein Research Institute showed that clothes treated with NanoSphere technology allowed tomato sauce, coffee and red wine to be easily washed away even after a few washes. Another possible application is thus with self-cleaning awnings, tarpaulins and sails, which otherwise quickly become dirty and difficult to clean.

Superhydrophobic coatings applied to microwave antennas can significantly reduce rain fade and the buildup of ice and snow. "Easy to clean" products in ads are often mistaken for the self-cleaning properties of hydrophobic or ultrahydrophobic surfaces. Patterned ultrahydrophobic surfaces also show promise for "lab-on-a-chip" microfluidic devices and can greatly improve surface-based bioanalysis.

Superhydrophobic or hydrophobic properties have been used in dew harvesting, or the funneling of water to a basin for use in irrigation. The Groasis Waterboxx has a lid with a microscopic pyramidal structure based on the ultrahydrophobic properties that funnel condensation and rainwater into a basin for release to a growing plant's roots.

== Research history ==
Although the self-cleaning phenomenon of the lotus was possibly known in Asia long before (reference to the lotus effect is found in the Bhagavad Gita), its mechanism was explained only in the 1970s after the introduction of the scanning electron microscope. Studies were performed with leaves of Tropaeolum and lotus (Nelumbo). Similar to the lotus effect, a recent study has revealed honeycomb-like micro-structures on the taro leaf, which makes the leaf superhydrophobic. The measured contact angle on this leaf in this study is around 148 degrees.

== See also ==
- Biomimetics
- Petal effect
- Salvinia effect
