= Green photocatalyst =

Solar-powered catalysts made from environmentally friendly materials

Green photocatalysts are photocatalysts derived from environmentally friendly sources. They are synthesized from natural, renewable, and biological resources, such as plant extracts, biomass, or microorganisms, minimizing the use of toxic chemicals and reducing the environmental impact associated with conventional photocatalyst production.

A photocatalyst is a material that absorbs light energy to initiate or accelerate a chemical reaction without being consumed in the process. They are semiconducting materials which generate electron-hole pairs upon light irradiation. These photogenerated charge carriers then migrate to the surface of the photocatalyst and interact with adsorbed species, triggering redox reactions. They are promising candidates for a wide range of applications, including the degradation of organic pollutants in wastewater, the reduction of harmful gases, and the production of hydrogen or solar fuels. Many methods exist to produce photocatalysts via both conventional and more green approaches including hydrothermal synthesis or sol-gel, the difference being in the material sources used.

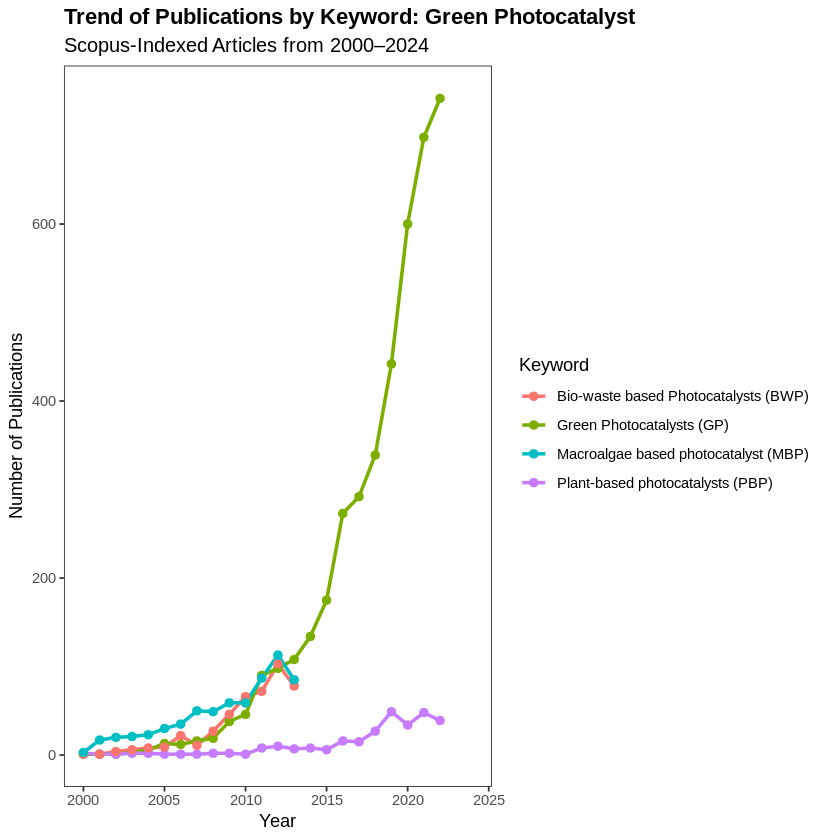
Trend of Scopus-indexed publications on green photocatalysts, including bio-waste, macroalgae, and plant-based materials, from 2000 to 2024

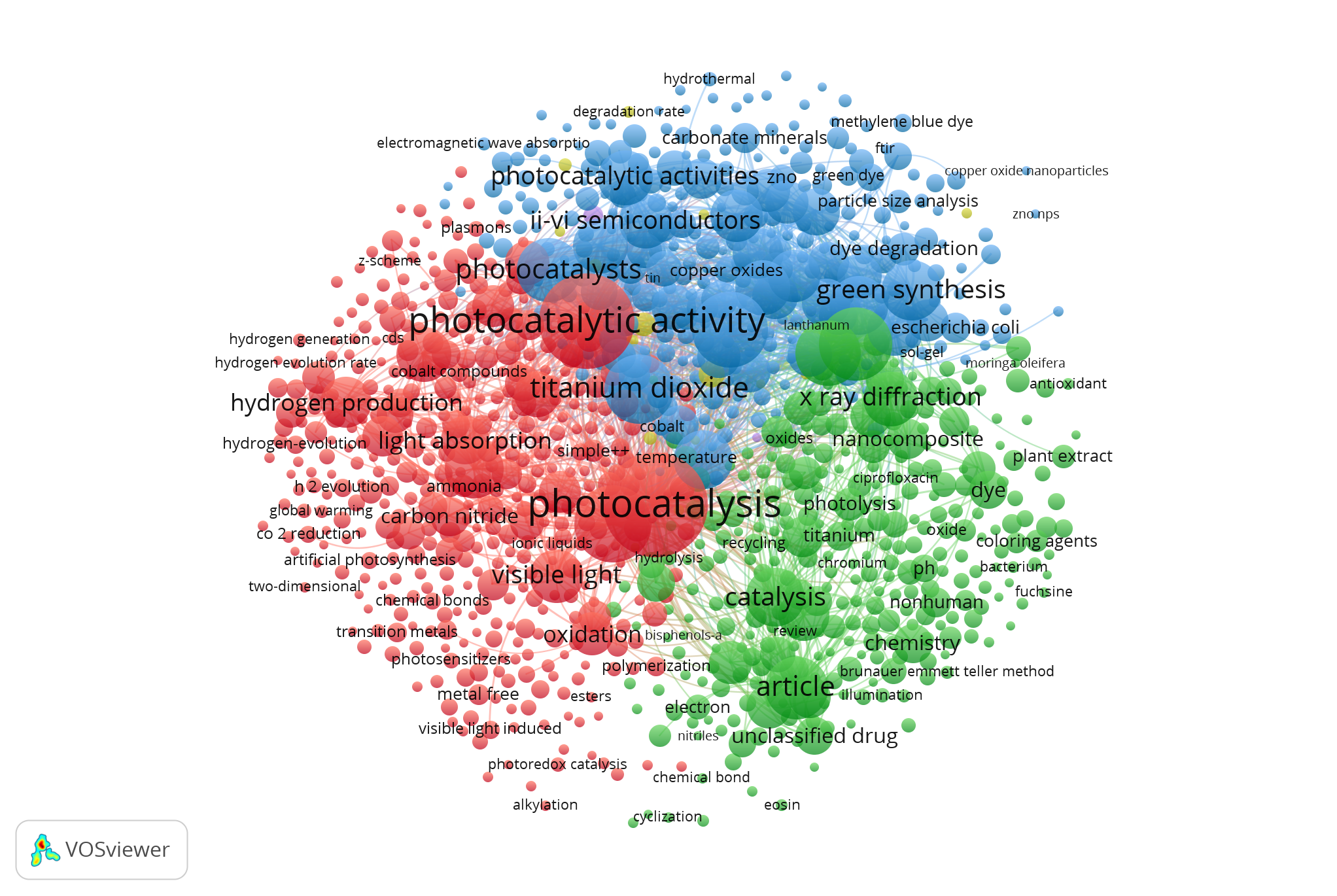
VOSviewer analysis (© 2024 Centre for Science and Technology Studies, Leiden University) of 5,375 Scopus documents (1999–2026) retrieved using the search query "TITLE-ABS-KEY(green AND photocatalyst) AND PUBYEAR > 1999 AND PUBYEAR < 2026" reveals key trends in green photocatalyst research, including a focus on environmentally friendly synthesis methods and applications in environmental remediation and energy production

== Green precursor materials for photocatalysts ==
=== Green sources ===
A green source for photocatalyst synthesis refers to a material that is renewable, biodegradable, and has minimal environmental impact during its extraction and processing. This approach aligns with the principles of green chemistry, which aim to reduce or eliminate the use and generation of hazardous substances in chemical processes. Green sources are abundant, readily available, and often considered as waste materials, thus offering a sustainable and cost-effective alternative to conventional photocatalyst precursors.

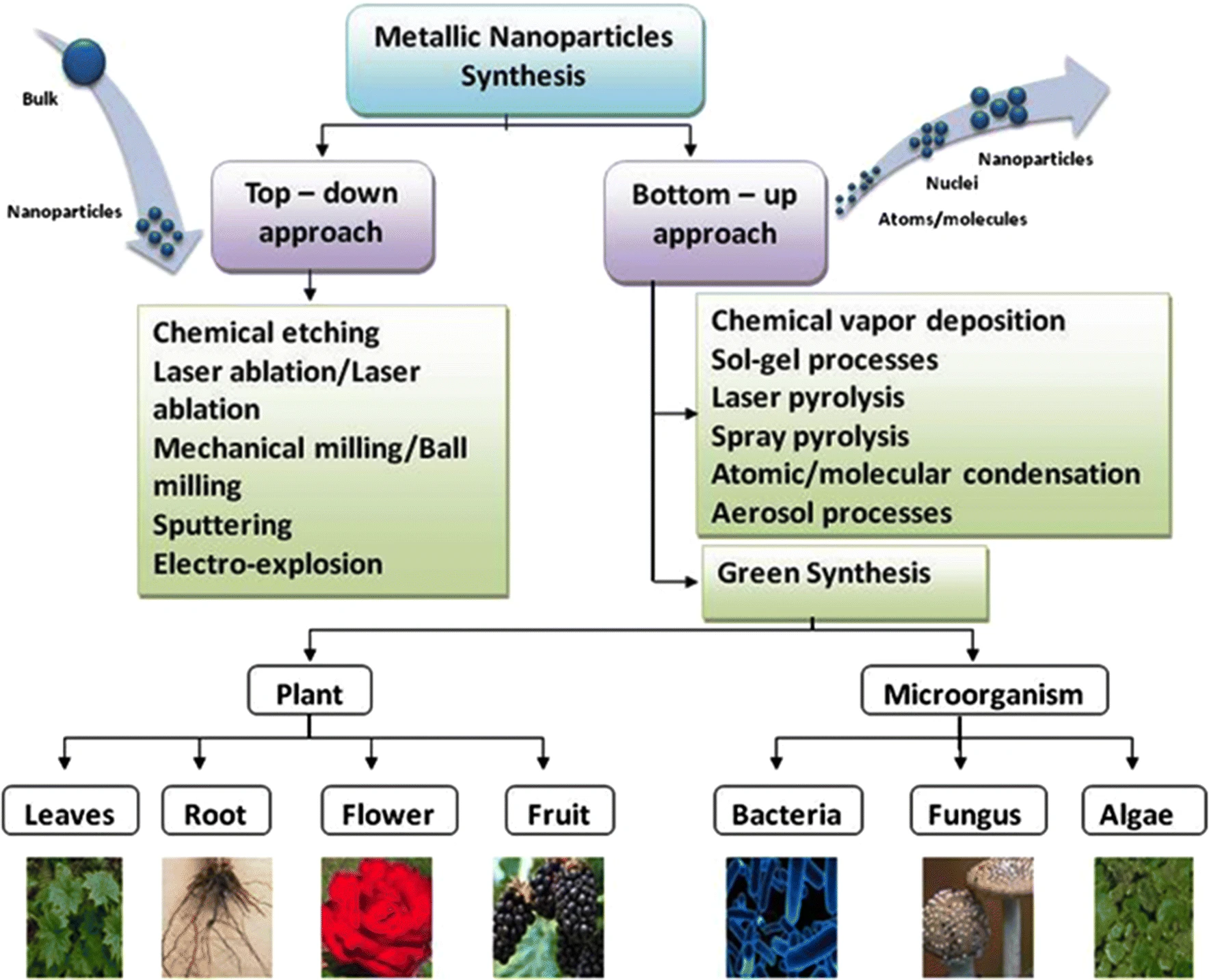
Different synthesis approaches available for the preparation of metal nanoparticles for various application including as Green Photocatalyst

=== Plant-based precursors ===
Plant extracts and agricultural waste products have emerged as promising green sources for photocatalyst production, offering attractive alternatives to conventional precursors due to their abundance, biodegradability, and cost-effectiveness. Extracts from various plant parts, such as leaves, roots, and fruits, contain phyto-chemicals that can act as reducing and stabilizing agents in nanoparticle synthesis, contributing to the formation of desired photocatalyst morphologies. Meanwhile, waste materials from agricultural processes, such as rice husks and sugarcane bagasse, are rich in cellulose and lignin. These components can be used as precursors for carbon-based photocatalyst or as templates for the synthesis of porous nano-materials.

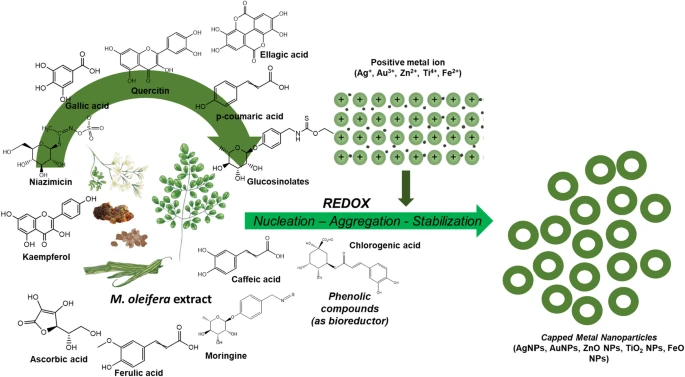
Phenolic compounds role in the M. oleifera NPs synthesis

Plant-Based Nanoparticle/Nanocatalysts: Synthesis, Size, and Shape
Plant	Common/Popular Name	NPs synthesized and produced	Size of NPs (nm)	Shape of NPs	Reference
Citrus limetta	Sweet Lime/Mosambi	CdO	54	Quasi-spherical	
Dillenia indica	Elephant Apple	CuO	15	Spherical	
Mikania micrantha	Mile-a-minute Weed/American Rope	CuO	15	Spherical	
Jackfruit	Jackfruit	La_{2}O_{3}	30	Needle-shaped	
Sansevieria trifasciata	Snake Plant/Mother-in-Law's Tongue	ZnFe_{2}O_{4}	5–20	Spherical	
Commelina benghalensis	Benghal Dayflower/Tropical Spiderwort	Ag–ZnO–CSs	20-100	Spherical	
Commelina benghalensis	Benghal Dayflower/Tropical Spiderwort	Au–ZnO–CSs	50-400	Spherical	
Senna siamea	Siamese Cassia/Kassod Tree	ZnO	37.39	Spherical	
Epipremnum aureum	Pothos/Devil's Ivy/Money Plant	ZnO	29	Spherical	
Chinese Mahogany	Chinese Mahogany	LO	22.56	Long rod-like particles	
Citrullus colocynthis	Colocynth/Bitter Apple	Cu	17 ± 4.2	Spherical	
Aegle marmelos	Bael/Bengal Quince	FeO	18.78	Spherical	
Couroupita guianensis	Cannonball Tree	CaO	25.2	Clusters with irregular forms	

Notes:

- NPs: Nanoparticles
- CSS: Core-Shell Structure
- The table summarizes various plant-based nanoparticles and nanocatalysts, including their synthesis methods, particle sizes, shapes, and corresponding references.

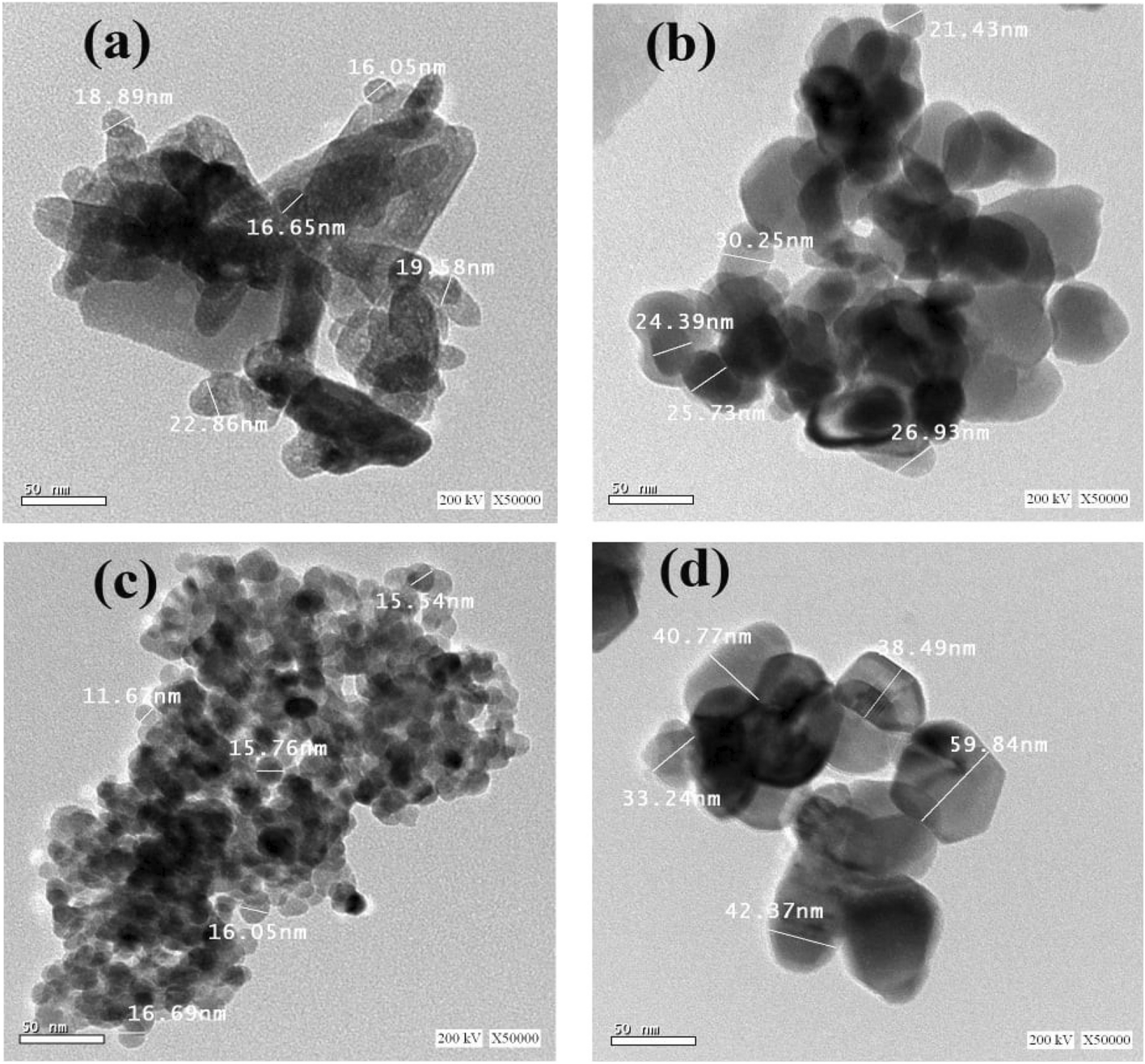
Electron microscope images of ZnO nanoparticles synthesized by chemical and green methods using beetroot, cedar, and pomegranate extracts at different resolutions

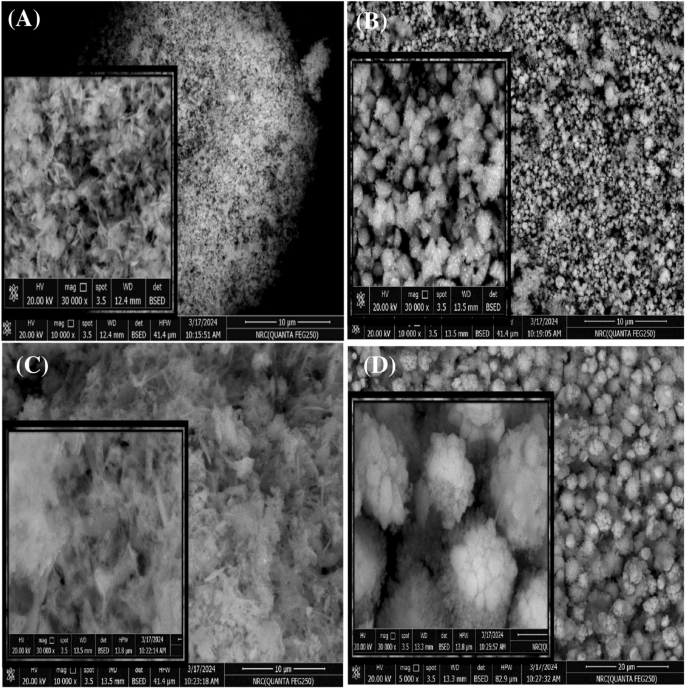
SEM images of ZnO nanoparticles synthesized by chemical and green methods using beetroot, cedar, and pomegranate extracts at different resolutions

=== Bio-waste precursors ===
Utilizing bio-waste, such as food waste and animal waste, for green photocatalyst synthesis offers a dual benefit of waste management and material production. These waste streams are rich in organic matter, which can be converted into valuable carbon-based photocatalyst through various thermochemical processes.

Bio-Waste/Agro-Waste Derived Nanomaterials: A Summary of Synthesis, Size, and Shape
Bio-waste	NPs synthesized and produced	Size of NPs (nm)	Shape of NPs	Reference
Waste oyster shells	nHAp/ZnO/GO	9–22	Spherical	
Rice husk	TiO_{2}	6.2–7.6	Irregular sharp cylinder-like particles	
Waste of chicken eggshell	CaO@NiO	15-20	Rod-like shape	
Papaya (Carica papaya L.) peel biowaste	CuO	85–140	Agglomerated spherical	
Dragon fruit (Hylocereus polyrhizus) peel biowaste	ZnO	56	Spherical	
Longan seeds biowaste	ZnO	10–100	Irregular and hexagonal	
Banana pseudo stem	TiO_{2}	9.98–24.56	Polyhedral	
Agro-waste durva grass	ZrO_{2}	15-35	Spherical	
Agricultural waste Hibiscus cannabinus	γ-Fe_{2}O_{3}/Si	48.3	Spherical	
Citrus reticulata Blanco (C. reticulata) waste	ZnO	9	Hexagonal	
Rooibos tea waste	Fe_{2}O_{3}–SnO_{2}	-	Tone-like structures, tiny rod-like structures, and well-dispersed	
Sugarcane bagasse	Cu_{2}O	38.02	Irregular	

Notes/Explanations:

- NPs: Nanoparticles
- nHAp/ZnO/GO: Nano-hydroxyapatite/Zinc Oxide/Graphene Oxide composite
- CaO@NiO: Calcium Oxide coated with Nickel Oxide
- y-Fe_{2}O_{3}/Si: Gamma-Iron(III) Oxide supported on Silicon
- Fe_{2}O_{3}-SnO_{2}: Iron Oxide-Tin Oxide composite

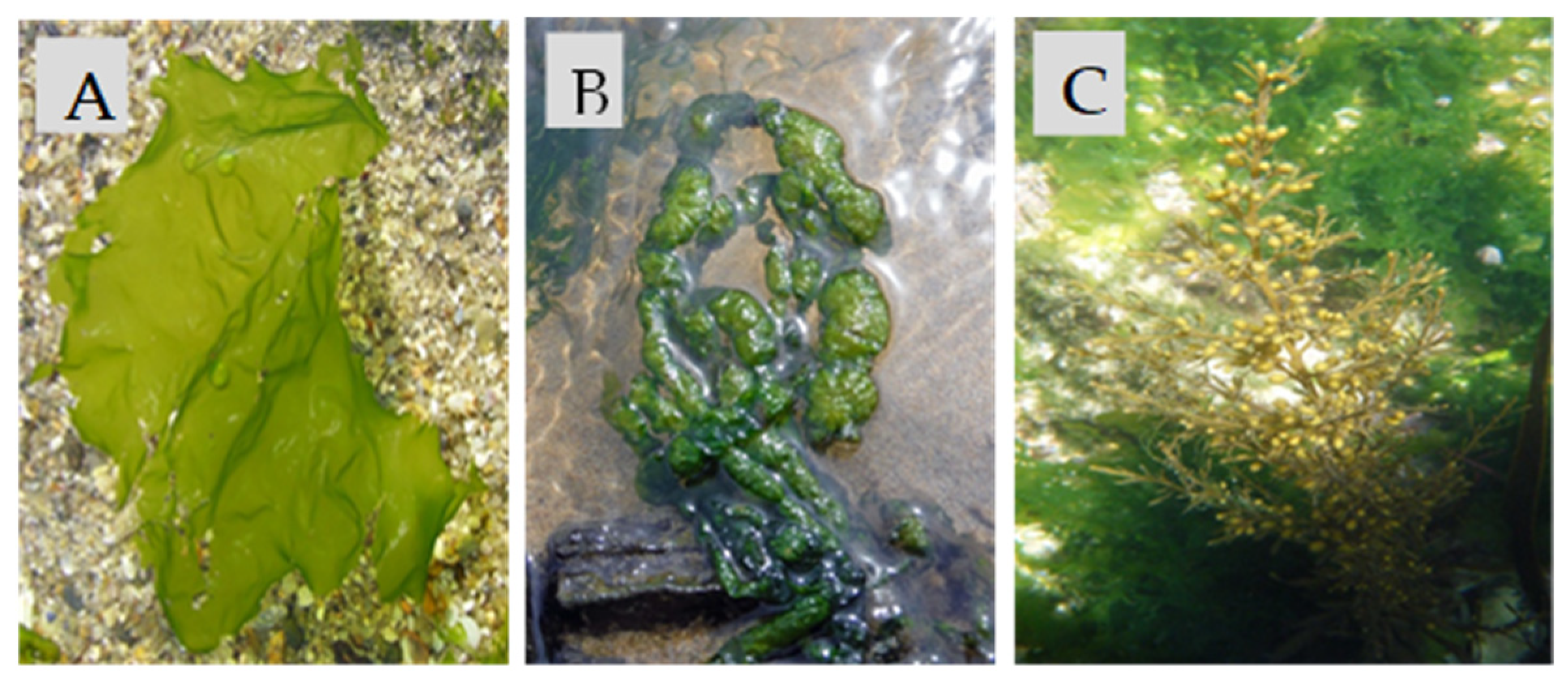
Green synthesis of ZnO nanoparticles using extracts from three marine macroalgae: (A) Ulva lactuca, (B) Ulva intestinalis, and (C) Sargassum muticum

=== Marine macroalgae/seaweed precursors ===
Seaweed is a highly promising green source for photocatalyst synthesis due to its rapid growth rates and minimal environmental requirements. It does not require freshwater or fertilizers for cultivation, making it a sustainable and environmentally friendly option. Various seaweed species have been explored for their ability to produce nanoparticles and to act as templates for the synthesis of photocatalytic materials.

Bio-Fabrication of Nanoparticles Using Marine Macroalgae Extracts
Species of Macroalgal	Bioactive Substances	Phytochemical Activities	NPs synthesized and produced	Size of NPs (nm)	Shape of NPs	Reference
Sargassum vulgare	Polyphenols, polysaccharides, phytohormones, carotenoids, vitamins, unsaturated fatty acids and free amino acids.	Reducing and capping agents	Zn	50-150	Spherical	
Sargassum myriocystum	Phenol	Reducing and capping agents	Ag	20 ± 2.2	Well dispersed hexagonal	
Sargassum coreanum	Polysaccharides, polyphenols, lignans	Reducing and stabilizing agent	Ag	19	Distorted spherical shape	
Sargassum spp.	Phenolics compounds	Capping agent	Ag	2-35	Spherical	
Padina tetrastromatica	Favonoids, steroids, saponins, tannins, phenols and proteins	Reducing and stabilizing agent	Au	11.4	Nearly spherical	
Sargassum spp.	Ase terpenoids, flavones, and polysaccharides	Capping and stabilization agent	Fe_{3}O_{4}	23.60 ± 0.62	Agglomerated spherical	
Sargassum tenerrimum	Polyphenol and proteins	Reducing, capping, and stabilizing agents	Ag	22.5	Spherical	
Sargassum duplicatum	Proteins containing amide and carboxyl groups and carbohydrates	Reducing and stabilizing agent	Ag	20-50	Spherical	
Caulerpa sertularioides	Alkaloids, phenols, flavonoids, tannins, terpenoids, carbohydrates, glycosides, amino acids, and proteins	Reducing and capping agent	Ag	24-57	Spherical	
Galaxaura elongata, Turbinaria ornata, and Enteromorpha flexuosa	Alkaloids, flavonoids, phenolic compounds, proteins, and sugars	Reducing and capping agent	Ag	20-25	Spherical	
Lobophora variegata	Polyphenol, bromophenols, lobophorones, and sulphated polysaccharide	Reduction, capping and stabilizing agent	Ag	6.5-10	Oval	
red marine algae (Bushehr province, Iran)	Amino acids, polysaccharides, carbohydrates	Reducing and coating agent	NiO	32.64	Spherical	

Notes/Explanations:

- NPs: Nanoparticles

=== Dispersion and stability of green sources ===
Marine Macroalgae as Green Stabilizing Agents for Nanoparticle Synthesis: Dispersion and Stability
Reference	Marine Macroalgae	Biogenic Capping Agents	NPs synthesized and produced	Zeta Potential	Stability	PDI	Dispersion	Potential Applications
	Sargassum spp.	Polyphenols	Ag	−22.6 mV	High stability	0.246	Monodispersity	Pollutant detection in environmental
	Polycladia crinita	Primary and tertiary amines, polysaccharides, amino acids	Se	− 13.9 mV	High stability	-	Polydispersed	Drug delivery
	Cystoseira tamariscifolia	Polyphenols and polysaccharides	Au	−24.6 ± 1.5 mV	High stability	-	-	Biomedical
	Polysiphonia urceolata	Phenols (bromophenols), terpenes, steroids, carbohydrates, and polypeptides	CeO_{2}NPs, NiONPs and CeO_{2}/NiO NCS	-	High stability	-	Polydispersed	Toxic ofloxacin remediation and antibacterial (green surfactant)
	Padina boergesenii	Phenolic compounds, aromatic amine groups, nitro compounds, and aliphatic amines	Se-ZnO	−16.4 mV	High stability	0.262	Polydispersed	Biomedicine (anti-cancer)
	Ulva lactuca	Polyphenols, flavonoids, terpenoids, polysaccharides, and proteins	Ag	−59.0 mV	High stability	1.092	Monodispersed	Azo-dyes Photodegradation and biomedical usage
	Enteromorpha prolifera	Alcohol, thiol, carbon dioxide, and ketanine, alkene, carboxylic acid and amine and alkene compound	Ag	− 30.8 mV	High stability	0.277	Polydispersed	Biomedical field
	Sargassum wightii	Polyphenols	ZnO	− 49.39 mV	High stability	0.150	Polydispersed	Biomedical field
	Turbinaria ornata	Flavonoid and phenolic	Ag	–63.3 mV	High stability	0.313	Monodispersed	Biomedical field
	Sargassum angustifolium	Polyphenols	Ag	− 27 mV	High stability	0.15	Monodispersed	Biomedicine (anti-bactrerial)
	Gracilaria birdiae	Polysaccharides	Ag	−28.7 ± 0.7 mV - −31.7 ± 0.4 mV	High stability	0.35 -0.68	Monodispersed	Biomedicine

Notes/Explanations:

- NPs: Nanoparticles
- Zeta Potential: A measure of the surface charge of nanoparticles, which influences their stability and dispersion.
- PDI: Polydispersity Index, a measure of the size distribution of nanoparticles.

=== Common green precursor materials for photocatalysts ===
Green Synthesis of Nano-materials Using Plant and Bio-Waste Extracts
Material	Green Source(s)	Advantages of Source	Reference
TiO_{2}	Plant extracts (e.g., Aloe vera)	Abundant, biocompatible	
ZnO	Agricultural waste (e.g., rice husks)	Renewable, low cost, high surface area in derived materials	
CuO	Plant extracts (e.g., Hibiscus sabdariffa L.)	Biocompatible, non-toxic, can act as reducing and capping agents	
CeO_{2}	Plant extracts (e.g., Azadirachta indica)	Abundant, eco-friendly	
Carbon quantum dots	Bio-waste (e.g., food waste)	Waste management, cost-effective, tunable properties	
Graphene quantum dots	Bio-waste (e.g., Spent tea leaves)	Waste management, cost-effective, tunable properties	

== Photocatalyst synthesis methods ==
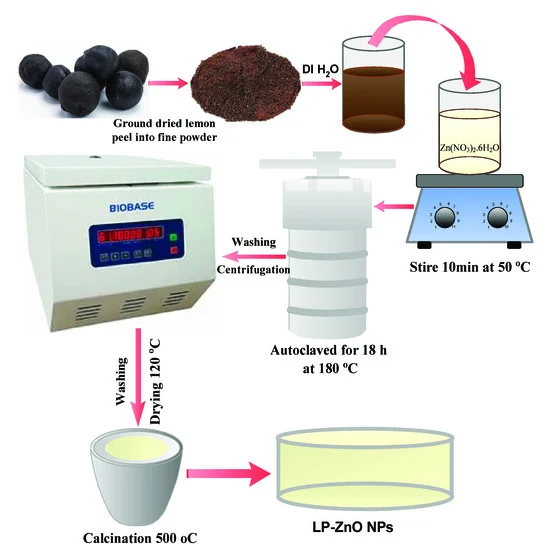
Schematic representation of the preparation of Lemon Peel, LP-ZnO NPs by hydrothermal method

=== Hydrothermal synthesis ===
Hydrothermal synthesis is a green method that utilizes water under high pressure and temperature to facilitate chemical reactions. It often avoids the need for organic solvents and offers control over crystal size and morphology, making it a versatile approach for producing various photocatalyst materials.

=== Microwave-assisted synthesis ===
Microwave-assisted synthesis employs microwaves to provide rapid and uniform heating, leading to faster reaction rates and potential for significant energy savings compared to conventional heating methods. This technique is increasingly favored in green synthesis due to its reduced energy consumption and potential for shorter reaction times.

=== Sol-gel method ===
The sol-gel method involves the formation of a gel from a solution, followed by its conversion into a solid material through controlled drying and calcination. It is a versatile technique widely used in the production of various photocatalyst materials, offering advantages in terms of controlling material composition and morphology.

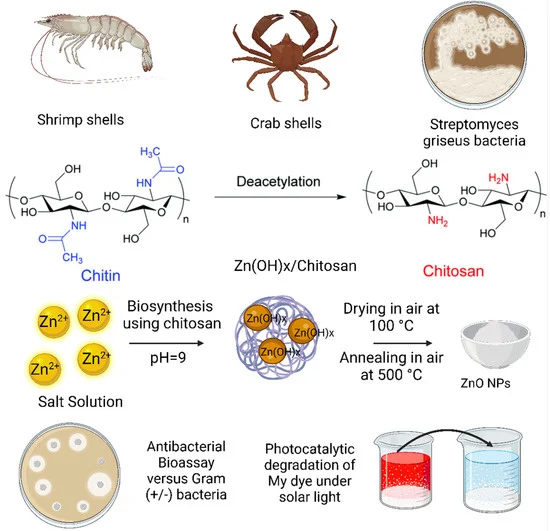
The schematic representation of the sol-gel synthesis of ZnO NPs using different types of chitosan sources and their application in antibacterial and photocatalytic degradation of MB dye

=== Comparing photocatalyst synthesis methods ===
The table below provides a comparison of the advantages, potential limitations, and suitability of different green synthesis methods:

Comparison of Common Green Nanomaterials Synthesis Methods
Method	Description	Advantages	Potential Limitations	Suitable for...	Reference
Hydrothermal Synthesis	Water under high pressure & temperature facilitate chemical reactions	Avoids organic solvents, controls crystal size & morphology	Longer reaction times, specialized equipment needed	Producing various photocatalytic materials	
Microwave-Assisted Synthesis	Microwaves provide rapid & uniform heating	Faster reaction rates, energy efficient	Limited scalability, potential for uneven heating	Synthesis of nanomaterials with controlled size & morphology	
Sol-Gel Method	Gel from a solution is converted into a solid material	Versatile in producing various materials, controls composition & morphology	Requires careful control of parameters, can be time-consuming	Metal oxide nanoparticles, thin films, and coatings	

== Applications of photocatalysts ==
=== Wastewater treatment ===
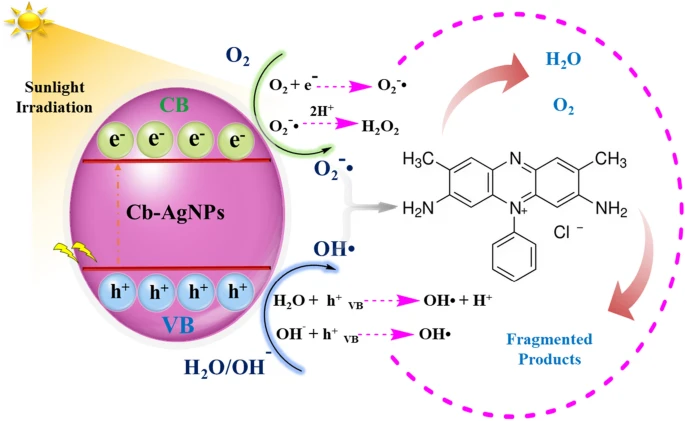
Photocatalytic degradation mechanism of Safranin O dye pollutant using Centaurea behen leaf-AgNP composites under sunlight irradiation

==== Degradation of organic pollutants ====
Green photocatalyst effectively break down organic contaminants in wastewater into less harmful products through a process known as photocatalytic oxidation. Upon light irradiation, the photocatalyst generates reactive oxygen species (ROS), such as hydroxyl radicals (•OH) and superoxide radicals (O_{2}•-), which attack and decompose organic pollutants. Green photocatalyst synthesized from plant extracts or agricultural waste have shown promising results in degrading various dye molecules, including methylene blue, rhodamine B, and methyl orange. Green photocatalyst have demonstrated the ability to remove pharmaceutical contaminants such as carbamazepine, ibuprofen, tetracycline from wastewater. Additionally, green photocatalyst have been successfully employed in the degradation of pesticides such as alachlor.

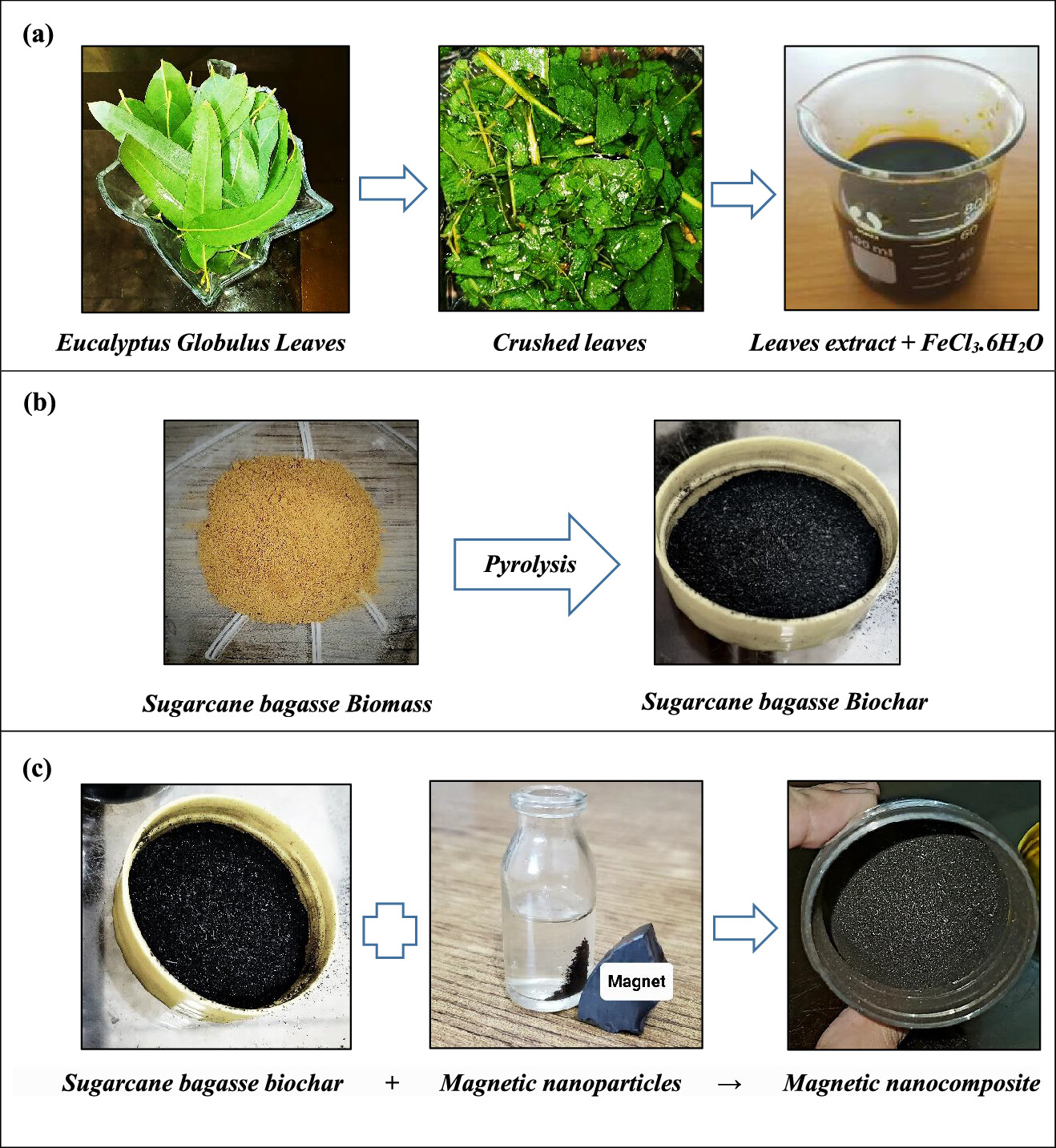
Green synthesis of magnetic nanocomposites using Eucalyptus globulus leaf extract and sugarcane bagasse biochar for the photocatalytic degradation of ciprofloxacin and amoxicillin

Plant-Based Synthesis of Nanoparticles for Environmental Remediation (Organic Compounds Degradation)
Plant	Bioactive substances	NPs synthesized and produced	Size of NPs (nm)	Shape of NPs	Applications	Ref
Froriepia subpinnata	Flavonoids and phenolic	Ag	18	Hemispherical and hexagonal	Antimicrobial and adsorption of the Azo dye Acid-Red 58	
Rhododendron arboreum	Steroids, terpenoids, alkaloids, saponins, phenols, flavonoids, tannins, glycosides and polyphenolic	ZnO	29.424	Spherical	Dye photodegradation	
Elettaria cardamomum	Phenolic	CoFe_{2}O_{4}	20–50	Spherical	Phenol red dye photodegradation	
Zingiber officinale	Phenolic	CoFe_{2}O_{4}	20–50	Spherical	Phenol red dye photodegradation	
Tillandsia recurvata	Tannins, reducing sugars, and carbohydrates	ZnO	12–61	Spherical	Methylene blue (MB) photodegradation	
Ajuga iva	Carbohydrates, phenol groups, acidic fractions	Ag	100-300	Polygonal poly–dispersed	Methylene blue (MB) photodegradation	
Macleaya cordata	Phenolic	CuO	80	rectangular and square with irregular rod	Methylene blue (MB) photodegradation and antibacterial	
Coleus scutellariodes	Phenolic	NiO	23	Rod shape	Antibiotic (rufloxacin) photodegradation	
Eupatorium adenophorum	Sesquiterpenoids, triterpenes, flavonoids, phenolics, coumarins, steroids, polyphenols, and phenylpropanols	Ag	30–400	Spherical	Rhodamin B photodegradation	

Notes/Explanations:

- NPs: Nanoparticles
- CoFe_{2}O_{4}: Cobalt Ferrite

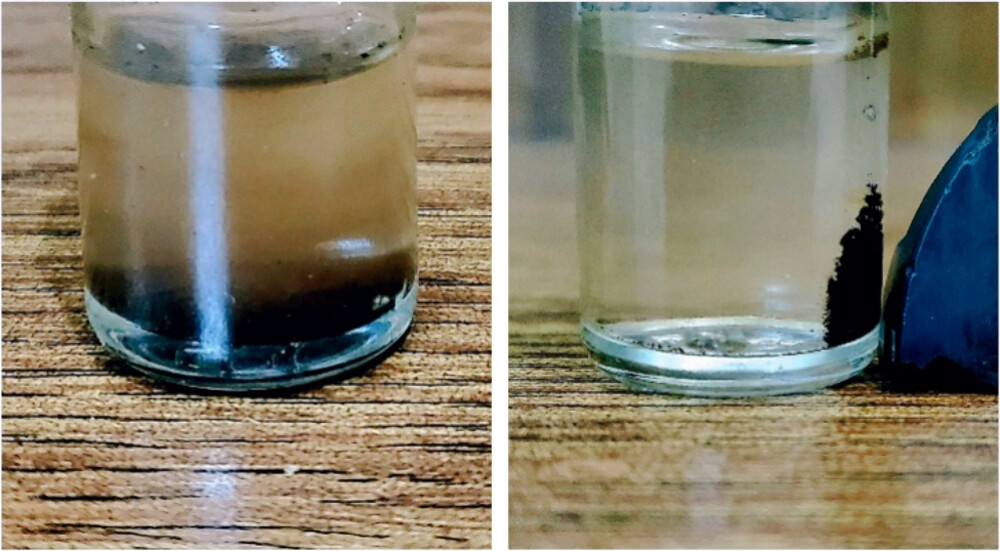
Magnetic separation of green synthesized of magnetic nanocomposites using Eucalyptus globulus leaf extract and sugarcane bagasse biochar for the photocatalytic degradation of antibiotics, ciprofloxacin and amoxicillin

==== Removal of heavy metals ====
In addition to degrading organic pollutants, green photocatalyst can also contribute to the removal of toxic heavy metals from wastewater. The large surface area and functional groups present on green photocatalyst, particularly those derived from carbon-based sources like bio-waste, can effectively adsorb heavy metal ions from the water. Furthermore, photogenerated electrons from the green photocatalyst can reduce heavy metal ions to their less toxic elemental forms, which can then be more easily removed from the wastewater.

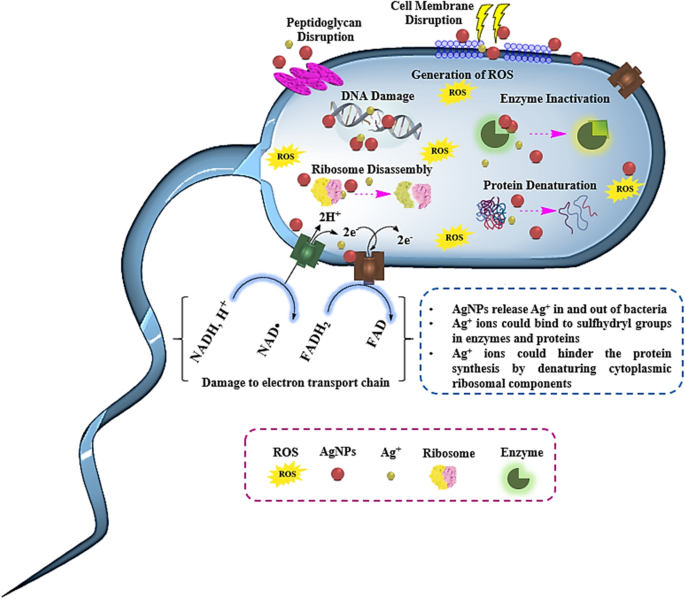
Antibacterial mechanism of Cb-AgNPs: disruption of cell membrane, generation of reactive oxygen species (ROS), and damage to cellular components

=== Antibacterial activity ===
==== Mechanisms of action ====
Green photocatalyst exhibit potent antibacterial properties due to their ability to generate ROS upon light irradiation. These ROS, including hydroxyl radicals and superoxide radicals, can damage bacterial cell walls and membranes, leading to cell death.

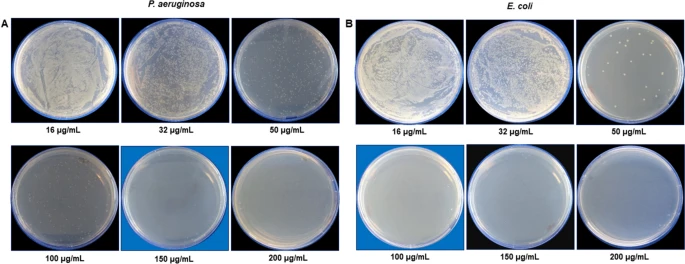
Antibacterial activity of Ligustrum vulgare berry extracts derived silver nanoparticles (LV-AgNPs) against P. aeruginosa and E. coli at various concentrations

==== Examples and applications ====
Several green photocatalyst have shown promising antibacterial activity. ZnO nanoparticles synthesized using plant extracts have demonstrated strong antibacterial activity against a wide range of bacteria, including E. coli and Staphylococcus aureus. TiO_{2}-based photocatalyst, particularly those doped with silver or copper, exhibit enhanced antibacterial properties under visible light irradiation, making them suitable for disinfection applications. Potential applications of these materials include water disinfection and the creation of antibacterial surfaces. Green photocatalyst can be used to disinfect water by killing harmful bacteria, offering a sustainable alternative to conventional disinfection methods. Incorporating them into coatings or surfaces can create self-sterilizing materials, reducing the risk of bacterial contamination in healthcare settings and other environments.

Plant-Based Synthesis of Nanoparticles for Biomedical Applications (Antimicrobial)
Plant	Bioactive substances	NPs synthesized and produced	Size of NPs (nm)	Shape of NPs	Applications	Ref
Piper guineense (Uziza)	Phenolics and flavonoids	ZnO	7.39	Spherical and well-dispersed	Antibacterial	
Olea europaea	Protein, carbonyl, carboxyl, amide, and phenols	Ag/Ag_{2}O	45	Spherical	Antimicrobial	
Froriepia subpinnata	Flavonoids and phenolic	Ag	18	Hemispherical and hexagonal	Antimicrobial and adsorption of the Azo dye Acid-Red 58	
Vitex negundo	Flavonoids	ZnO	40-50	Spherical	Antibacterial and Anticancer	

Notes/Explanations:

- NPs: Nanoparticles
- Ag/Ag_{2}O: Silver/Silver Oxide Composite

== Toxicity assessments ==
=== Importance of toxicity evaluation ===
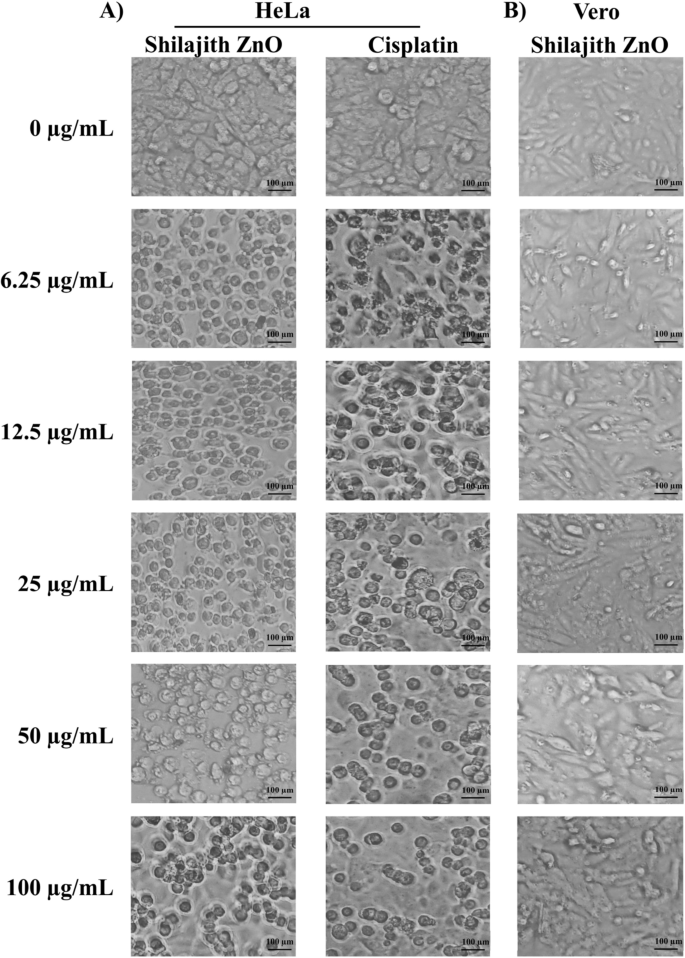
Cytotoxic effect of shilajit-derived ZnO nanoparticles on HeLa cancer cells compared to cisplatin and normal Vero cells

Despite their sustainable origins, a thorough evaluation of the potential toxicity of green photocatalyst is essential to ensure their safe and responsible application in various settings. Even though they are synthesized from environmentally benign materials, their unique properties and nanoscale dimensions can potentially pose risks to human health and the environment. It is crucial to assess the potential for adverse effects before widespread implementation of these materials in water treatment, air purification, or biomedical applications.

=== Methods for toxicity assessment ===
Various methods are employed to assess the potential toxicity of green photocatalyst. Eco-toxicity tests expose organisms such as algae, daphnia, or fish to varying concentrations of the photocatalyst to evaluate their effects on growth, reproduction, or mortality. These tests provide valuable insights into the potential impact of green photocatalyst on aquatic ecosystems. Cytotoxicity assays are conducted in laboratory settings using human cell lines to evaluate the potential toxicity of green photocatalysts to human cells. These assays help determine the potential for adverse effects on human health upon exposure to these materials.

Toxicity Assessment of Marine Macroalgae-Derived Nanoparticles
Reference	Macroalgal–NPs	Animal/Organism Model	Toxicity Test	Exposure Duration	Concentration/Dose	Toxicity
	Ericaria amentacea–AgNPs	Artemia salina	Brine shrimp test	24 h	17.08 μg/mL	Low
	Sargassum polycystum–AgNPs	Artemia salina	Brine shrimp test	24 h and 48 h	20 to 100 ppm	Low
	Polycladia myrica–GZ	Amphibalanus amphitrite	Barnacle larvae cytotoxicity	24 h	0.031 mg mL^{−1}	Low
	Kappaphycus alvarezii–ZnONPs	3T3	MTT assay	24 h and 48 h	5, 10, 20, 25, 50 and 100 μg/mL	Low
	Kappaphycus alvarezii–ZnONPs	MCF 7	MTT assay	48 h	75 μg/mL	High

Notes/Explanations:

- NPs: Nanoparticles
- MTT Assay: 3-(4,5-Dimethylthiazol-2-yl)-2,5-diphenyltetrazolium bromide assay, a colorimetric method to assess cell viability.

== See also ==
- Catalysis – Process of increasing the rate of a chemical reaction
- Heterogeneous catalysis – Type of catalysis involving reactants & catalysts in different phases of matter
- Industrial catalysts – Catalysts used in industry
- Light harvesting materials – Materials that convert light to energy
- Nanoparticle – Particle with size less than 100 nm
- Photocatalysis – Acceleration of a photoreaction in the presence of a catalyst
