= Streptomyces tunisiensis =

Scientific classification
- Domain: Bacteria
- Kingdom: Bacillati
- Phylum: Actinomycetota
- Class: Actinomycetia
- Order: Streptomycetales
- Family: Streptomycetaceae
- Genus: Streptomyces
- Species: S. tunisiensis

Binomial name
- Streptomyces tunisiensis Slama et al. 2014

Type strain
- CN-207, DSM 42037, JCM 17589

Species of bacterium

Streptomyces tunisiensis is a bacterium species from the genus of Streptomyces which has been isolated from forest soil in Tunis in Tunisia. Streptomyces tunisiensis has antibacterial activity. The novel actinomycete strain, designated CN-207T, exhibited potent broad spectrum antibacterial activity against xlinical isolates of methicillin-resistant Staphylooccus species and several other Gram-positive and Gram-negative bacteria.

== See also ==
- List of Streptomyces species
