= Adampur Forest =

Forest beat under the Rajkandi Reserved Forest of Bangladesh

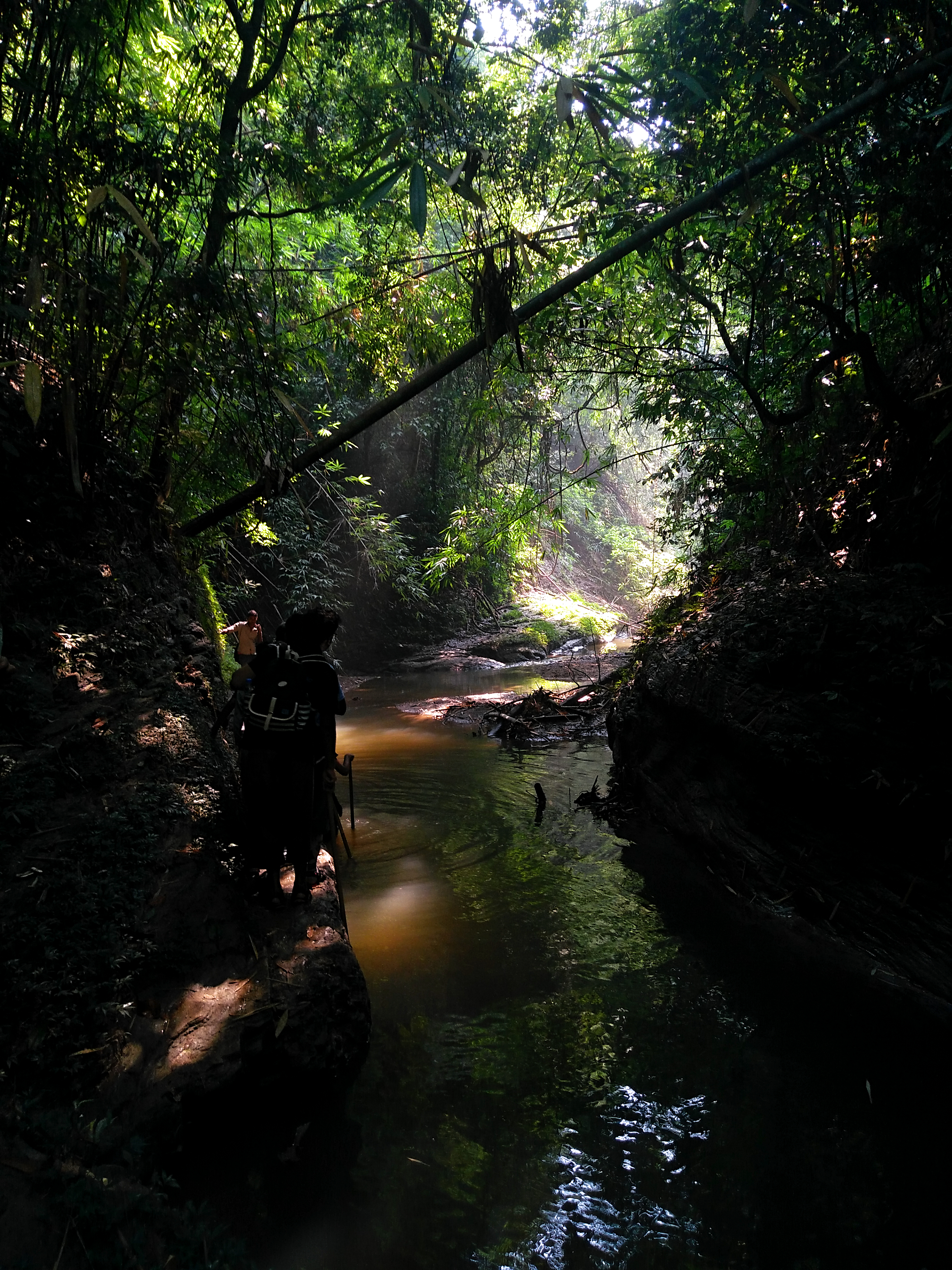
- Jhiripath is one of the routes to reach the Hum Hum waterfall, located in the Adampur forest.

- Location within Bangladesh

Geography
- Location: Adampur, Bangladesh
- Coordinates: 24.2668°N 91.9068°E
- Area: 13,080 acres (5,290 ha)

Administration
- Status: Active
- Authority: Bangladesh Forest Department

Adampur Forest (also known as Kauargola Forest and Adampur Jungle) is the name of a forest beat under the Rajkandi Reserved Forest of Bangladesh's Sylhet Division, located in Moulvibazar District within Kamalganj Upazila. It is a tourist attraction.

== Location ==
The forest is located ten kilometers from Kamalganj Upazila in Moulvibazar District. Just beyond this border-adjacent forest lies the Indian state of Tripura. Inside Adampur Forest, there is a Forest Department inspection bungalow.

== Description ==
Adampur Forest is quite secluded with very little human presence. A Khasi village is located near the forest. The jungle mainly stretches over uneven hills. Walking paths run beneath large trees, and in some places the trail goes between two hills.

== Flora ==
Inside the Adampur Forest, there are large bamboo groves. Species such as Muli (Melocanna baccifera), Mitenga, Dolu, and Rupai bamboo are most common in this forest. It is also rich in dense greenery and diverse types of native trees and plants. Noteworthy among them are Chapalish (Artocarpus chaplasha), Sal (Shorea robusta), Garjan (Dipterocarpus spp.), Champa flower, Jarul (Lagerstroemia speciosa), Minjiri (Cassia siamea), Chaw, Jhau (Casuarina equisetifolia), Koroi (Albizia lebbeck), Olive (Elaeocarpus serratus), Mango (Mangifera indica), Jackfruit (Artocarpus heterophyllus), Coconut (Cocos nucifera), Betel nut (Areca catechu), Carambola (Averrhoa carambola), Elephant apple (Dillenia indica), Agarwood (Aquilaria agallocha), Delonix regia, Bombax ceiba, Bajna, Nagkesar, Mimusops elengi, Hijal, Ficus carica, and various species of Calamus spp. Numerous types of shrubs, herbs, and climbers give this park its exceptional natural beauty. In addition, on both sides of the road before entering Adampur Forest, there are many agarwood plantations.

== Fauna ==
Hoolock gibbons are rarely seen, but their calls can be heard deep within the forest. Deeper inside, Colobinae and Capped langur are also seen. Bears inhabit this forest as well. Various species of birds and animals roam in the wild here. These include Foxes, Monkeys, Jackals, Hares, Civets, Junglefowl, Mathura, Fishing cats, Barking deer, and vultures, along with birds like Hill myna, Parakeets, Doves, Haridas, and Jungle babbler.
