= Photocatalysis =

Acceleration of a photoreaction in the presence of a catalyst

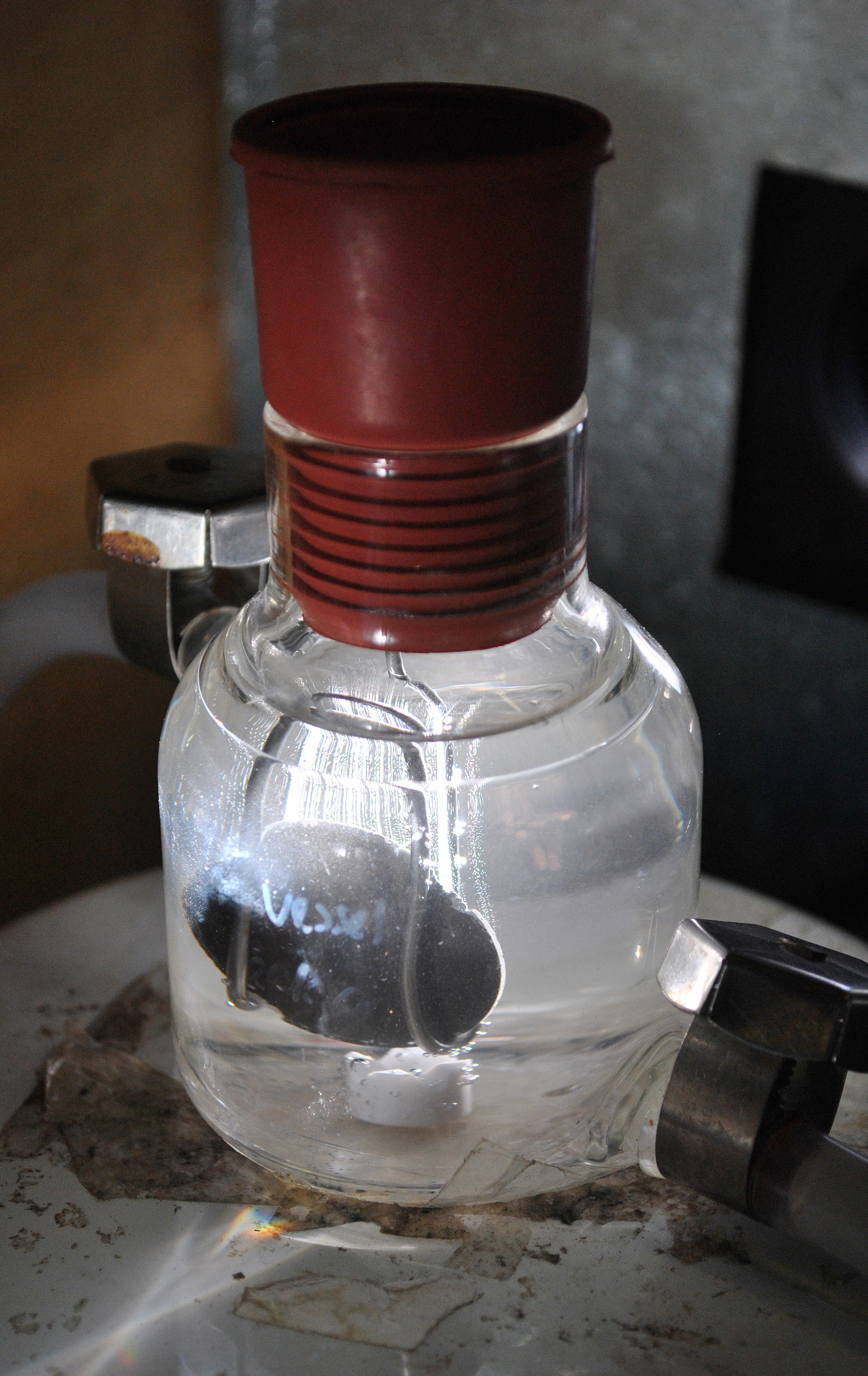
In the experiment above, photons from a light source (out of frame on the right hand side) are absorbed by the surface of the titanium dioxide (TiO_{2}) disc, exciting electrons within the material. These then react with the water molecules, splitting it into its constituents of hydrogen and oxygen. In this experiment, chemicals dissolved in the water prevent the formation of oxygen, which would otherwise recombine with the hydrogen.

In chemistry, photocatalysis is the acceleration of a photoreaction in the presence of a photocatalyst, the excited state of which "repeatedly interacts with the reaction partners forming reaction intermediates and regenerates itself after each cycle of such interactions." In many cases, the catalyst is a solid that upon irradiation with UV- or visible light generates electron–hole pairs that generate free radicals. Nanophotocatalysis is the specialization of photocatalysis in the nanoscale.

Photocatalysts belong to three main groups; heterogeneous, homogeneous, and plasmonic antenna-reactor catalysts. The use of each catalysts depends on the preferred application and required catalysis reaction.

== History ==
=== Early mentions (1911–1938) ===
The earliest mention came in 1911, when German chemist Alexander Eibner integrated the concept in his research of the illumination of zinc oxide (ZnO) on the bleaching of the dark blue pigment, Prussian blue. Around this time, Bruner and Kozak published an article discussing the deterioration of oxalic acid in the presence of uranyl salts under illumination, while in 1913, Landau published an article explaining the phenomenon of photocatalysis. Their contributions led to the development of actinometric measurements, measurements that provide the basis of determining photon flux in photochemical reactions. After a hiatus, in 1921, Baly et al. used ferric hydroxides and colloidal uranium salts as catalysts for the creation of formaldehyde under visible light.

In 1938 Doodeve and Kitchener discovered that TiO_{2} , a highly-stable and non-toxic oxide, in the presence of oxygen could act as a photosensitizer for bleaching dyes, as ultraviolet light absorbed by TiO_{2} led to the production of active oxygen species on its surface, resulting in the blotching of organic chemicals via photooxidation. This was the first observation of the fundamental characteristics of heterogeneous photocatalysis.

=== 1964–2024 ===
Research in photocatalysis again paused until 1964, when V.N. Filimonov investigated isopropanol photooxidation from ZnO and TiO_{2}; while in 1965 Kato and Mashio, Doerffler and Hauffe, and Ikekawa et al. (1965) explored oxidation/photooxidation of CO_{2} and organic solvents from ZnO radiance. In 1970, Formenti et al. and Tanaka and Blyholde observed the oxidation of various alkenes and the photocatalytic decay of N_{2}O, respectively.

A breakthrough occurred in 1972, when Akira Fujishima and Kenichi Honda discovered that electrochemical photolysis of water occurred when a TiO_{2} electrode irradiated with ultraviolet light was electrically connected to a platinum electrode. As the ultraviolet light was absorbed by the TiO_{2} electrode, electrons flowed from the anode to the platinum cathode where hydrogen gas was produced. This was one of the first instances of hydrogen production from a clean and cost-effective source, as the majority of hydrogen production comes from natural gas reforming and gasification. Fujishima's and Honda's findings led to other advances. In 1977, Nozik discovered that the incorporation of a noble metal in the electrochemical photolysis process, such as platinum and gold, among others, could increase photoactivity, and that an external potential was not required. Wagner and Somorjai (1980) and Sakata and Kawai (1981) delineated hydrogen production on the surface of strontium titanate (SrTiO_{3}) via photogeneration, and the generation of hydrogen and methane from the illumination of TiO_{2} and PtO_{2} in ethanol, respectively.

For many decades photocatalysis had not been developed for commercial purposes. Chu et al. (2017) assessed the future of electrochemical photolysis of water, discussing its major challenge of developing a cost-effective, energy-efficient photoelectrochemical (PEC) tandem cell, which would, "mimic natural photosynthesis".

== Types of photocatalysis ==
=== Heterogeneous photocatalysis ===
In heterogeneous catalysis the catalyst is in a different phase from the reactants. Heterogeneous photocatalysis is a discipline which includes a large variety of reactions: mild or total oxidations, dehydrogenation, hydrogen transfer, ^{18}O_{2}–^{16}O_{2} and deuterium-alkane isotopic exchange, metal deposition, water detoxification, and gaseous pollutant removal.

Most heterogeneous photocatalysts are transition metal oxides and semiconductors. Unlike metals, which have a continuum of electronic states, semiconductors possess a void energy region where no energy levels are available to promote recombination of an electron and hole produced by photoactivation in the solid. The difference in energy between the filled valence band and the empty conduction band in the MO diagram of a semiconductor is the band gap. When the semiconductor absorbs a photon with energy equal to or greater than the material's band gap, an electron excites from the valence band to the conduction band, generating an electron hole in the valence band. This electron-hole pair is an exciton. The excited electron and hole can recombine and release the energy gained from the excitation of the electron as heat. Such exciton recombination is undesirable and higher levels cost efficiency. Efforts to develop functional photocatalysts often emphasize extending exciton lifetime, improving electron-hole separation using diverse approaches that may rely on structural features such as phase hetero-junctions (e.g. anatase-rutile interfaces), noble-metal nanoparticles, silicon nanowires and substitutional cation doping. The ultimate goal of photocatalyst design is to facilitate reactions of the excited electrons with oxidants to produce reduced products, and/or reactions of the generated holes with reductants to produce oxidized products. Due to the generation of positive holes (h^{+}) and excited electrons (e^{−}), oxidation-reduction reactions take place at the surface of semiconductors irradiated with light.

In one mechanism of the oxidative reaction, holes react with the moisture present on the surface and produce a hydroxyl radical. The reaction starts by photo-induced exciton generation in the metal oxide (MO) surface by photon (hv) absorption:

MO + hν → MO (h^{+} + e^{−})

Oxidative reactions due to photocatalytic effect:

h^{+} + H_{2}O → H^{+} + •OH
2 h^{+} + 2 H_{2}O → 2 H^{+} + H_{2}O_{2}
H_{2}O_{2}→ 2 •OH

Reductive reactions due to photocatalytic effect:

e^{−} + O_{2} → •O_{2}^{−}
•O_{2}^{−} + HO_{2}• + H^{+} → H_{2}O_{2} + O_{2}
H_{2}O_{2} → 2 •OH

Ultimately, both reactions generate hydroxyl radicals. These radicals are oxidative in nature and nonselective with a redox potential of E_{0} = +3.06 V. This is significantly greater than many common organic compounds, which typically are not greater than E_{0} = +2.00 V. This results in the non-selective oxidative behavior of these radicals.

TiO_{2}, a wide band-gap semiconductor, is a common choice for heterogeneous catalysis. Inertness to chemical environment and long-term photostability has made TiO_{2} an important material in many practical applications. Investigation of TiO_{2} in the rutile (bandgap 3.0 eV) and anatase (bandgap 3.2 eV) phases is common. The absorption of photons with energy equal to or greater than the band gap of the semiconductor initiates photocatalytic reactions. This produces electron-hole (e^{−} /h^{+}) pairs:

$$\ce{TiO2 ->[{hv}][{}] e- (TiO2) + h+(TiO2)}$$

Where the electron is in the conduction band and the hole is in the valence band. The irradiated TiO_{2} particle can behave as an electron donor or acceptor for molecules in contact with the semiconductor. It can participate in redox reactions with adsorbed species, as the valence band hole is strongly oxidizing while the conduction band electron is strongly reducing.

=== Homogeneous photocatalysis ===
In homogeneous photocatalysis, the reactants and the photocatalysts exist in the same phase. The process by which the atmosphere self-cleans and removes large organic compounds is a gas phase homogenous photocatalysis reaction. The ozone process is often referenced when developing many photocatalysts:

$$\ce{2 O3(g) + H2O(g)  ->[{hv}]  O2(g) + 2OH.}$$

Most homogeneous photocatalytic reactions are aqueous phase, with a transition-metal complex photocatalyst. The wide use of transition-metal complexes as photocatalysts is in large part due to the large band gap and high stability of the species. Homogeneous photocatalysts are common in the production of clean hydrogen fuel production, with the notable use of cobalt and iron complexes.

Iron complex hydroxy-radical formation using the ozone process is common in the production of hydrogen fuel (similar to Fenton's reagent process done in low pH conditions without photoexcitation):

$$\ce{Fe^2+ +H2O2 ->[{hv}] Fe^3+ +OH- + HO.}$$

$$\ce{Fe^3+ +H2O2 ->[{hv}] Fe^2+ H+ + HO2.}$$

$$\ce{Fe^2+ +HO. -> Fe^3+ +OH-}$$

Complex-based photocatalysts are semiconductors, and operate under the same electronic properties as heterogeneous catalysts.

=== Plasmonic antenna-reactor photocatalysis ===
A plasmonic antenna-reactor photocatalyst is a photocatalyst that combines a catalyst with attached antenna that increases the catalyst's ability to absorb light, thereby increasing its efficiency.

A SiO_{2} catalyst combined with an Au light absorber accelerated hydrogen sulfide-to-hydrogen reactions. The process is an alternative to the conventional Claus process that operates at 800–1,000 °C (1,470–1,830 °F).

A Fe catalyst combined with a Cu light absorber can produce hydrogen from ammonia (NH_{3}) at ambient temperature using visible light. Conventional Cu-Ru production operates at 650–1,000 °C (1,202–1,832 °F).

== Applications ==
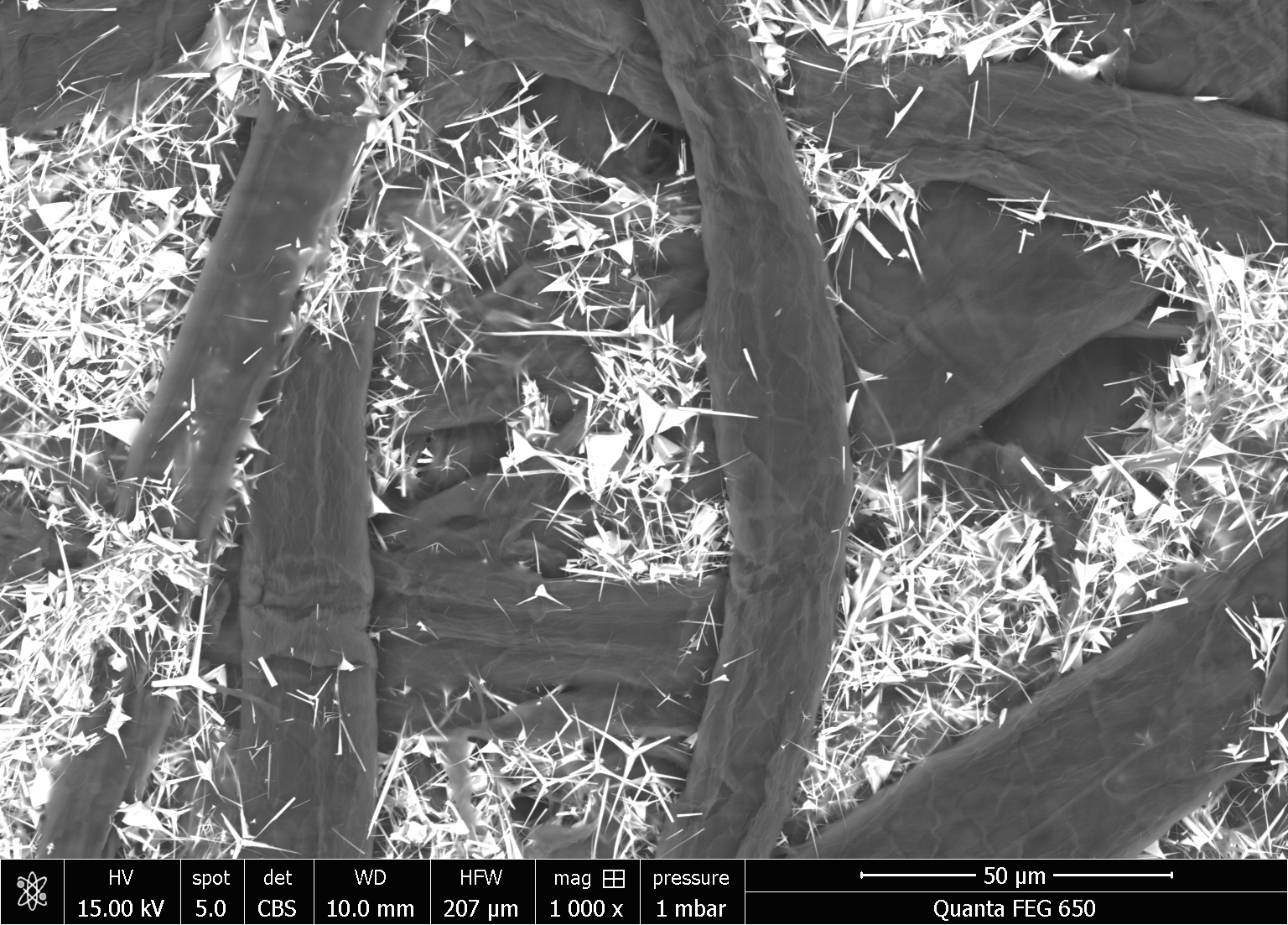
SEM image of wood pulp (dark fibers) and tetrapodal zinc oxide micro particles (white and spiky) in paper.

Photoactive catalysts have been introduced over the last decade, such as TiO_{2} and ZnO nanorods. Most suffer from the fact that they can only perform under UV irradiation due to their band structure. Other photocatalysts, including a graphene-ZnO nanocompound counter this problem. For several decades, there have been numerous attempts to develop active photocatalysts with broad light absorption capabilities. High-entropy photocatalysts, first introduced in 2020, are the result of one such effort. They have been utilized for hydrogen production, oxygen production, carbon dioxide conversion, and plastic waste conversion.

=== Paper ===
Micro-sized ZnO tetrapodal particles added to pilot paper production. The most common are one-dimensional nanostructures, such as nanorods, nanotubes, nanofibers, nanowires, but also nanoplates, nanosheets, nanospheres, tetrapods. ZnO is strongly oxidative, chemically stable, with enhanced photocatalytic activity, and has a large free-exciton binding energy. It is non-toxic, abundant, biocompatible, biodegradable, environmentally friendly, low cost, and compatible with simple chemical synthesis. ZnO faces limits to its widespread use in photocatalysis under solar radiation. Several approaches have been suggested to overcome this limitation, including doping for reducing the band gap and improving charge carrier separation.

=== Water splitting ===
Photocatalytic water splitting separates water into hydrogen and oxygen:

2 H_{2}O → 2 H_{2} + O_{2}

The most prevalently investigated material, TiO_{2} , is inefficient. Mixtures of TiO_{2} and nickel oxide (NiO) are more active. NiO allows a significant exploitation of the visible spectrum. One efficient photocatalyst in the UV range is based on sodium tantalite (NaTaO_{3}) doped with lanthanum and loaded with a nickel oxide cocatalyst. The surface is grooved with nanosteps from doping with lanthanum (3–15 nm range, see nanotechnology). The NiO particles are present on the edges, with the oxygen evolving from the grooves.

=== Self-cleaning glass ===
Titanium dioxide takes part in self-cleaning glass. Free radicals generated from TiO_{2} oxidize organic matter. The rough wedge-like TiO_{2} surface can be modified with a hydrophobic monolayer of octadecylphosphonic acid (ODP). TiO_{2} surfaces that were plasma etched for 10 seconds and subsequent surface modifications with ODP showed a water contact angle greater than 150°. The surface was converted into a superhydrophilic surface (water contact angle = 0°) upon UV illumination, due to rapid decomposition of octadecylphosphonic acid coating resulting from TiO_{2} photocatalysis. Due to TiO_{2} 's wide band gap, light absorption by the semiconductor material and resulting superhydrophilic conversion of undoped TiO_{2} requires ultraviolet radiation (wavelength <390 nm) and thereby restricts self-cleaning to outdoor applications.

=== Disinfection and cleaning ===
Photocatalysis is widely applied in water treatment, surface sterilization, and the degradation of organic contaminants. In the last years, this technology has gained significant attention for its ability to degrade emerging and persistent pollutants (pharmaceuticals, microplastics, PFAs, antibiotic resistance bacteria (ARB) etc.) that conventional wastewater treatment plants fail to remove effectively. Thus, integrating photocatalysis with other technologies can reduce the cost, increase the effectiveness and make large-scale applications more viable.

Water disinfection and decontamination, including applications in solar water disinfection (SODIS). TiO_{2}-based self-sterilizing coatings for food-contact surfaces and high-touch environments. Magnetic TiO_{2} nanoparticle systems for oxidation of organic contaminants, enabling catalyst recovery via external magnetic fields. Sterilization of medical instruments and cleaning of optical and electronic components.

Visible-light-active photocatalysts based on bismuth oxyiodides (Bi_{x}O_{y}I_{z}) have also been investigated for the inactivation of microorganisms. Studies of these materials have reported photocatalytic inactivation of Escherichia coli under visible light and have associated the antimicrobial activity with interactions involving photogenerated charge carriers and reactive oxygen species.

=== Hydrocarbon production from CO_{2} ===
TiO_{2} conversion of CO_{2} into gaseous hydrocarbons. The proposed reaction mechanisms involve the creation of a highly reactive carbon radical from carbon monoxide and carbon dioxide which then reacts with photogenerated protons to ultimately form methane. Efficiencies of TiO_{2} -based photocatalysts are low, although nanostructures such as carbon nanotubes and metallic nanoparticles help.

=== Paints ===
ePaint is a less-toxic alternative to conventional antifouling marine paints that generates hydrogen peroxide.

Photocatalysis of organic reactions by polypyridyl complexes, porphyrins, or other dyes can produce materials inaccessible by classical approaches. Most photocatalytic dye degradation studies have employed TiO_{2}. The anatase form of TiO_{2} has higher photon absorption characteristics.

=== Filtration membranes ===
Photocatalyst radical generation species allow for the degradation of organic pollutants into non-toxic compounds at a high efficiency. Use of CuO nanosheets to breakdown azo bonds in food dyes is one such example, with 96.99% degradation after only 6 minutes. Degradation of organic matter is a highly applicable property, particularly in waste processing.

The use of photocatalyst TiO_{2} as a support system for filtration membranes shows promise in improving membrane bioreactors in the treatment of wastewater. Polymer-based membranes have shown reduced fouling and self-cleaning properties in both blended and coated TiO_{2} membranes. Photocatalyst-coated membranes show the most promise, as the increased surface exposure of the photocatalyst increases its organic degradation activity.

Photocatalysts are also highly effective reducers of toxic heavy metals like hexavalent chromium from water systems. Under visible light the reduction of Cr(VI) by a Ce-ZrO_{2} sol-gel on a silicon carbide was 97% effective at reducing the heavy metal to trivalent chromium.

=== Air Filtration ===
Light2CAT was a project funded by the European Commission from 2012 to 2015. It aimed to develop a modified TiO_{2} that can absorb visible light and include this modified TiO_{2} into construction concrete. The TiO_{2} degrades harmful pollutants such as NOx into NO_{3}^{−}. The modified TiO_{2} is in use in Copenhagen and Holbæk, Denmark, and Valencia, Spain. This "self-cleaning" concrete led to a 5-20% reduction in NOx over the course of a year.

=== Air purification ===
Photocatalytic oxidation allows semiconductor materials incorporated into construction products—such as pavements, paints, and stuccos—to degrade gaseous air pollutants into less harmful or more stable substances. Titanium dioxide (TiO_{2}) is one of the most widely studied photocatalysts for the oxidation of nitrogen oxides (NO_{x}).

Alternative semiconductor materials active under visible light have also been investigated for air purification. Bismuth oxyiodide (BiOI), including composites modified with graphene oxide, has been studied for the photocatalytic removal of nitrogen oxides. Its photocatalytic performance depends on factors such as synthesis conditions, morphology, surface properties and charge separation, which can influence the efficiency of NO_{x} oxidation and the formation of oxidation products such as nitrate.

== Quantification ==
ISO 22197-1:2007 specifies a test method for the measurement of NO_{2} removal for materials that contain a photocatalyst or have superficial photocatalytic films.

Specific FTIR systems are used to characterize photocatalytic activity or passivity, especially with respect to volatile organic compounds, and representative binder matrices.

Mass spectrometry allows measurement of photocatalytic activity by tracking the decomposition of gaseous pollutants such as nitrogen NOx or CO_{2}.

== See also ==
- Artificial photosynthesis
- Carbon dioxide removal
- Light harvesting materials
- Photoelectrochemical cell
- Photolysis
- Photocatalyst activity indicator ink
- Photocatalytic water splitting
- Photoredox catalysis
- Photoelectrochemical oxidation
- Photosensitizer
- Green photocatalyst
- Titanium dioxide
