= Photocatalyst activity indicator ink =

Photocatalyst activity indicator ink (paii) is a substance used to identify the presence of an underlying heterogeneous photocatalyst and to measure its activity. Such inks visibly render the activity of photocatalytic coatings applied to various "self-cleaning" products. The inks contain a dyestuff that reacts to ultraviolet radiation in the presence of the photocatalytic agent in the coating. They are applied to the coated product (usually by a pen, brush, or drawdown bar) and show a color change or disappearance when exposed to ultraviolet radiation. The use of a paii based on the dye resazurin forms the basis of an ISO standard test for photocatalytic activity.

== Applications ==
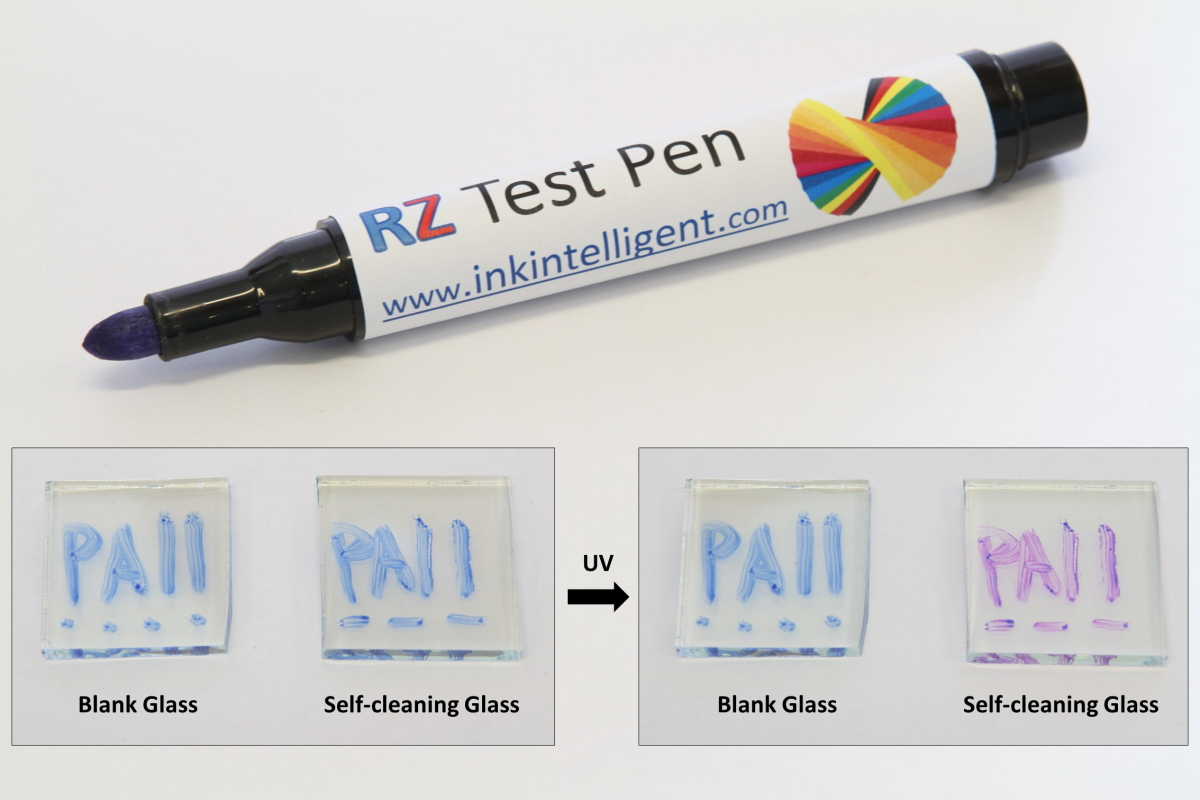
A commercial paii ink sold in a felt tip pen. It can be easily applied on a construction material (e.g. glass) to reveal the presence of a photocatalytic coating: in this case by changing its colour from blue to pink

A photocatalyst activity indicator, use ink quickly and easily identify the presence of an underlying heterogeneous photocatalyst and get provided a measure of its activity. A heterogeneous photocatalyst is a material that uses absorbed light energy (usually UV) to drive desired reactions that would not otherwise proceed under ambient conditions. Commercial photocatalytic products, which include: architectural glass, ceramic tiles, roof tiles, cement, paint, and fabrics are marketed on their ability to clean their own surfaces (i.e. are self-cleaning) and the ambient air. Paiis address the industry need for a rapid, simple, inexpensive method to demonstrate and assess the activities of the usually thin, invisible to the eye, photocatalytic coatings present on self-cleaning products. A paii, coated onto the surface of a photocatalyst material under test, works via a photoreductive mechanism, in which light absorbed by the photocatalyst drives the reduction of the dye in the paii, thereby producing a striking color change, which can be measured through the use of a simple mobile phone camera and application, in lieu of any sophisticated analytical equipment. Uses of paiis include: (i) laboratory, factory and on-site commercial photocatalyst product quality control (ii) marketing, for the rapid and striking demonstration of the efficacy of the usually invisible and otherwise slow-acting photocatalyst coating, (iii) counterfeit detection and (iv) evaluating new photocatalytic materials. The development and applications for such paiis have been reviewed in detail.

== Background ==
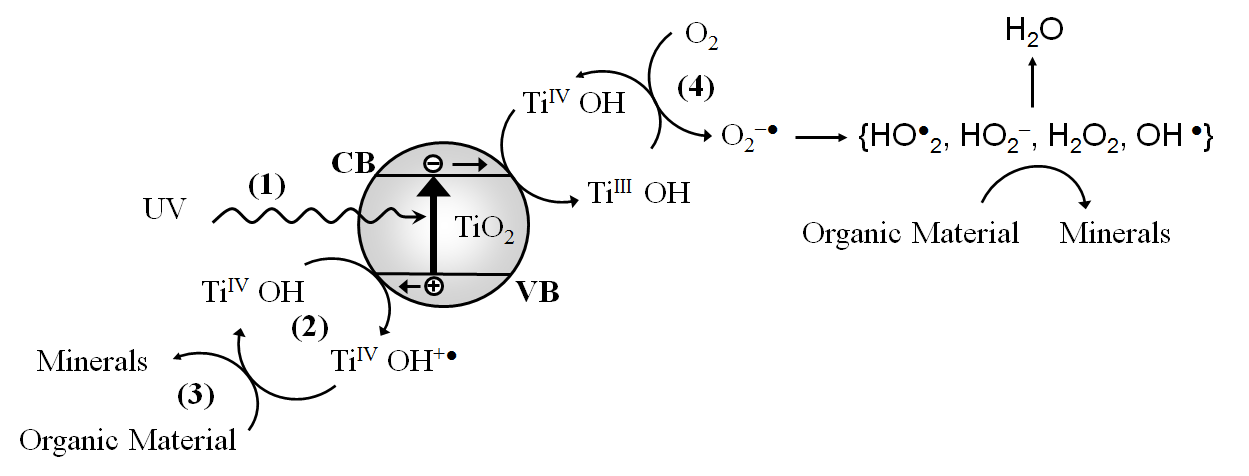
Figure 1. Schematic of the overall reaction, for the photocatalytic mineralisation of an organic pollutant on the surface of a titania photocatalyst film. (1) Ultra-band gap light generates electron-hole pairs. (2) Photogenerated holes migrate to the surface and can react with surface hydroxyl groups to generate hydroxyl radicals. (3) Organic pollutants are oxidised to their mineral form via these photogenerated hydroxyl radicals. (4) Photogenerated electrons can react with adsorbed oxygen to generate superoxide and subsequent other reactive species which can also oxidise organic pollutants.

Heterogeneous photocatalysis is the process that underpins the activity of most architectural materials, such as glass, ceramic tiles, roof tiles, concrete, paint, and fabrics which are promoted as being 'self-cleaning' (or 'air-purifying'). These photocatalytic materials facilitate the oxidative mineralisation of organic and inorganic species by ambient oxygen on their surfaces, rendering the surfaces clean and, usually, hydrophilic. In most commercial photocatalytic products the active layer is a thin, clear, colourless coating of the semiconductor anatase titania, which requires UV light to photogenerate the necessary electrons (e^{−}) and holes (h^{+}), in its conductance and valence bands, respectively, to promote the photocatalytic process. A schematic of the key processes behind the photocatalytic mineralisation of an organic pollutant on the surface of a titania photocatalyst film is illustrated in figure 1 and the overall reaction is summarised by:

(1)

Water molecules—adsorbed to the photocatalyst—are also needed to generate the hydroxyl groups on the surface.

The marketing of photocatalytic products and prevention of counterfeiting is made difficult because the photocatalytic coatings are usually and necessarily invisible to the eye. One way to achieve a visual demonstration of photocatalysis is to use a dyestuff, like methylene blue, dissolved in water, as the organic species to be mineralised, since, as the photocatalytic process proceeds, the colour of the dye disappears as it is oxidised. This approach forms the basis of a well-established ISO test for photocatalytic activity of films ISO. However, most photocatalyst commercial products use only a thin layer of titania (e.g. ca. 15 nm thick in self-cleaning glass) and ambient UV levels are often low (e.g. for a sunny day in the UK the UVA irradiance is only ca. 4 mW/cm^{2}). As a consequence, the photocatalytic oxidative bleaching of methylene blue is usually very slow, taking many hours, and so inappropriate for marketing at least.

== Theory ==
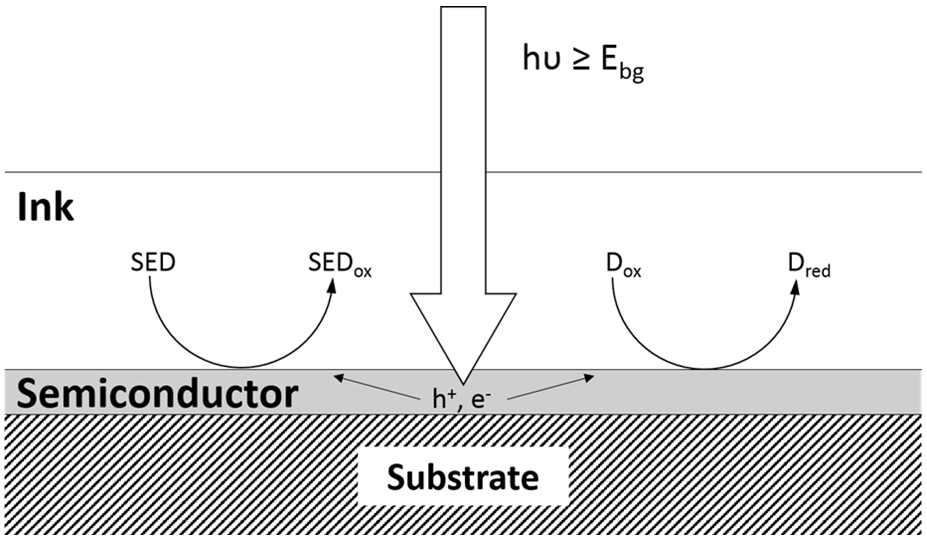
Figure 2. Photocatalyst Activity Indicator Ink (paii). Upon irradiation with UV light, photogenerated electrons (e^{−}) and holes (h^{+}) are produced on the surface of the self-cleaning coating. The sacrificial electron donor (SED) present in the paii ink effectively 'mops-up' the holes (h^{+}), allowing the electrons (e^{−}) to reduce the dye (D_{ox}) to another (usually colourless) form (D_{red}).

Photocatalyst activity indicator inks are a recent advance in the visual demonstration of photocatalysis and the assessment of the activity of photocatalyst materials. They are inexpensive, easy to use and provide a very quick route to demonstrating the presence of a photocatalytic film, even under low levels of UV light. Unlike the photo-oxidative bleaching of methylene blue, they use the underlying semiconductor photocatalyst film to photoreduce the dye (D_{ox} in figure 2), in the ink coating, to another (usually colourless) form, (D_{red} in figure 2) whilst simultaneously oxidising an easily oxidised organic species, a sacrificial electron donor (SED), such as glycerol, which is also present in the ink. The kinetics of reduction of the dye in a paii have been studied in great detail. Figure 2 illustrates the basic principles of operation of a paii when applied to a product that has a thin photocatalyst film coating.

== Practice ==
The ink is applied to the photocatalyst coating, usually using either a felt-tipped pen, air-brush, rubber stamp, paint brush, or a drawdown bar, and then exposed it to sunlight or an alternative, appropriate light source. The ink identifies the presence of the photocatalyst coating by changing colour upon irradiation of the latter at a rate (usually < 10 min) which provides a measure of the film's activity.

For example, it has been established that the rate of change in colour of an paii on commercial self-cleaning glass is directly related to the rate at which the glass is also able to photo-oxidatively mineralise, via reaction (1) the wax-like, natural fatty acid, stearic acid, found in finger prints. The rate of the rapid colour change associated with photocatalyst activity indicator inks has also been directly correlated with the photocatalytic oxidation of methylene blue and NO_{x}. It has also been shown that digital colour analysis of photographs monitoring the colour change of a paii can be used to extract apparent absorbance data which correlates well with UV-vis absorption data for the same sample, without the need for expensive spectrophotometric instrumentation.

By making the dyes in the ink increasing difficult to reduce chemically, for example by using: basic blue 66, resazurin, and acid violet 7, respectively, it is possible to make paiis which are effective on photocatalyst coatings which exhibit, respectively: low (most self-cleaning tiles), moderate (self-cleaning glass) or high (self-cleaning paints) activities. paiis based on the dyes 2,6-dichloroindophenol (DCIP) and methylene blue have also been reported.

Dyes and associated colour changes used in paiis
Dye	Colour (D_{ox})	Colour (D_{red})	Reference
Resazurin (Rz)	Blue	Pink	
Basic Blue 66 (BB66)	Blue	Colourless	
Acid Violet 7 (AV7)	Pink	Colourless	
Methylene Blue (MB)	Blue	Colourless	
2,6-Dichloroindophenol (DCIP)	Blue	Colourless	

== Applications ==
External videos
- Application of the new SunCatalyst Laboratories Paii Label

Paiis can be used as quality control and marketing tools in commerce and as a quick and easy way to assess and/or map the activities of new photocatalytic materials in research. In addition, it has also been demonstrated that such inks can be used on highly coloured and black surfaces, provided the oxidised and/or reduced form of the redox dye is luminescent, and that they can be effectively used to demonstrate the activity of visible light photocatalysts. In light of the need for in situ testing of commercial photocatalyst materials, paii labels have been developed that can be applied simply in the field on any surface to be tested, in both a non-reusable and reusable form. One noteworthy application of paiis is where a uniform film has been applied to a photocatalytic surface, and the variation in the rate of colour change across the surface has been monitored and used to generate a surface map of the photoactivity. By this method the uniformity of the surface activity may be investigated, and any "hotspots" of photoactivity identified. By varying the composition of a semiconductor photocatalyst surface across the surface itself, a paii photoactivity surface map may be used to determine the optimal composition which yields the greatest photocatalytic response.

The rapid colour change of paiis makes them suitable for such applications as:

- Quality control (in laboratory, factory and on site);
- Marketing;
- Counterfeit identification;
- Research material assessment.

== See also ==
- Photocatalysis
- Self-cleaning glass
