= Light harvesting materials =

Materials that convert light to energy

Light harvesting materials harvest solar energy that can then be converted into chemical energy through photochemical processes. Synthetic light harvesting materials are inspired by photosynthetic biological systems such as light harvesting complexes and pigments that are present in plants and some photosynthetic bacteria. The dynamic and efficient antenna complexes that are present in photosynthetic organisms has inspired the design of synthetic light harvesting materials that mimic light harvesting machinery in biological systems. Examples of synthetic light harvesting materials are dendrimers, porphyrin arrays and assemblies, organic gels, biosynthetic and synthetic peptides, organic-inorganic hybrid materials, and semiconductor materials (non-oxides, oxynitrides and oxysulfides). Synthetic and biosynthetic light harvesting materials have applications in photovoltaics, photocatalysis, and photopolymerization.

== Photochemical Processes ==
=== Organic Photovoltaic Cells ===
During photochemical processes employing donor and acceptor chromophores in organic solar cells, a photon is absorbed by the donor and an exciton is generated. The exciton diffuses to a donor/acceptor interface, or heterojunction, where an electron from the lowest unoccupied molecular orbital (LUMO) of the donor is transferred to the LUMO of the acceptor. This results in the formation of electron-hole pairs. When the photon is absorbed by the acceptor and the exciton reaches a heterojunction, an electron will then transfer from the HOMO of the donor to the HOMO of the acceptor. In order to make certain there is effective charge transfer, the continuous donor or acceptor domains must be smaller than the exciton diffusion length (< ~0.4 nm).

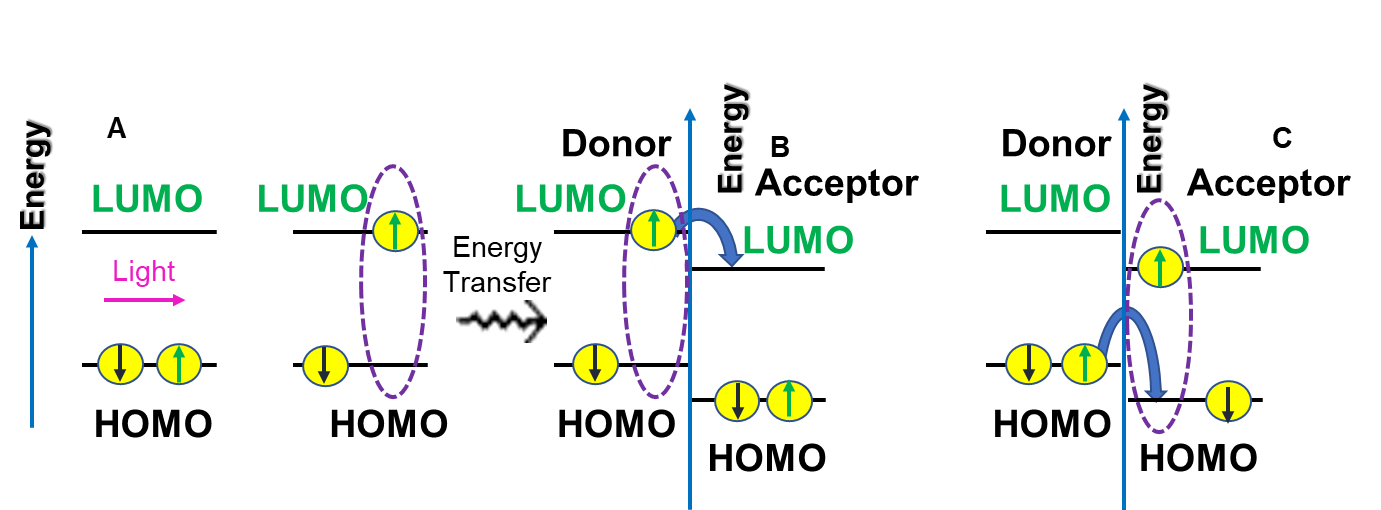
Figure 1: (A) Light absorption and the formation of a singlet exciton with the opposite "up" and "down" spins of electrons, followed by energy transfer to an electron donor and acceptor of a type II heterojunction and then (B) electron or (C) hole transfer can occur at the heterojunction.

=== Light Harvesting Efficiency ===
The light harvesting efficiency of energy transfer in light harvesting materials can be enhanced by either decreasing the distance between the donor and acceptor or designing a material that contains multiple antenna chromophores per acceptor (antenna effect). Förster Resonance Energy Transfer (FRET) Efficiency corresponds to the light harvesting efficiency and is determined by the spectroscopic properties of dyes/pigments or chromophores and the distances between the donor and acceptor; the limitations of FRET can be overcome by enhancing the antenna effect through modifying the stoichiometry of the electron donor, transmitter, and acceptor.

== Photosynthetic biological systems ==
Photosynthetic biological systems utilize sunlight, an abundant and ubiquitous energy source, as metabolic fuel. The highest efficiency for the conversion of energy from the sun into biomass by plants is around 4.6% at 30 °C and 380 ppm of atmospheric CO_{2} for carbon fixation during photosynthesis. Natural light harvesting complexes have molecular machinery that make possible the conversion of sunlight into chemical energy with almost 100% quantum efficiency. The ability of living organisms to harvest solar energy and achieve quantum efficiency near unity is due to the culmination of ~3.5 billion years of evolution. This efficiency is achieved in plants with a series of energy transfer steps, that are carried out through pigment-protein complexes (e.g. Photosystem II). Pigment-protein complexes (PPC) contain chromophore molecules, specifically chlorophylls and carotenoids that are embedded in a protein matrix. PPC serve as antenna complexes that absorb sunlight and the harvested energy from the sunlight then travels hundreds of nanometers to the reaction center; this energy essentially powers the electron transfer chain essential to photosynthesis and the downstream photosynthesis of plants. In order for charge or energy transfer to occur in the multielectron redox processes of the electron transfer chain, charge separation must occur first, which is induced by light harvesting.

=== Purple bacteria complexes ===
Purple bacteria, a photosynthetic organism also contains a PPC that is structurally different to the photosystems in plants but similar in terms of function. Exciton-transporting proteins found in purple bacteria such as Rhodospirillum photometricum or Rhodoblastus acidophilus, are light harvesting complex 1 and light harvesting complex 2. Light harvesting complex 2 in the purple bacteria Rhodoblastus acidophilus is shown in Figure 2. The light harvesting complex in purple bacteria is multifunctional; at high light intensities, the light harvesting complex typically switches into a quenched state through a conformational change of the PPC, and at low light intensities, the light harvesting complex typically reverts to an unquenched state. These conformational changes occur in light harvesting complex 2 in order to manage the metabolic cost corresponding to protein synthesis in purple bacteria.

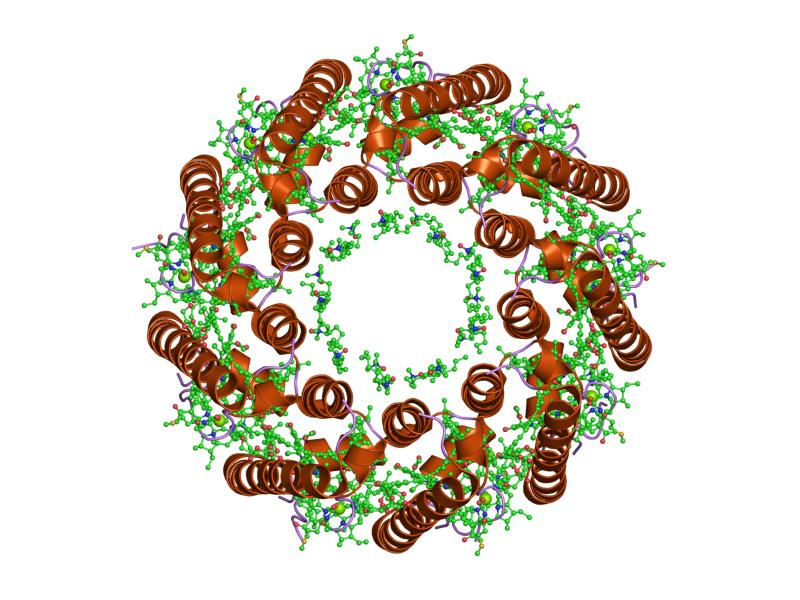
Figure 2: Light Harvesting Complex 2 in Rhodoblastus acidophilus a type of purple bacteria. PDB 2fkw EBI

=== Complexes in green plants ===
Conformational changes of proteins in PPC of vascular plants or higher plants also occur on the basis of light intensity. When there are lower light intensities for example on an overcast day, any absorbed sunlight by higher plants is converted to electricity for photosynthesis. When conditions allow for direct sunlight the capacity of PPC in higher plants to absorb and transfer energy, exceeds the capacity of downstream metabolic or biochemical processes. During periods of high light intensity plants and algae will enter a stage of non-photochemical quenching.

== Design and characterization of synthetic materials ==
=== Materials based on Porphyrins, Chlorophyll, and Carotenoids ===
Artificial light harvesting materials that serve as antenna are based on non-covalent supramolecular assemblies that contain motifs that are inspired by the pigment molecules chlorophyll and carotenoids that are embedded in protein-pigment complexes in nature. The class of pigments that are most commonly found in nature are chlorophylls and bacteriochlorophylls, the synthetic analogs of these biological chromophore molecules are porphyrins which are the most extensively used compounds in artificial light harvesting applications. The porphyrin moieties present in biological light harvesting complexes play a critical role in the efficient absorption of visible light, the harvested energy from the porphyrin-based molecules is then collected in the reaction center through the excitation energy transfer relay. The light-driven charge separation process occurs at the reaction center due to the cooperation of two porphyrin derivatives.

==== Porphyrin and chlorophyll bioinspired materials ====
Supramolecular assemblies of synthetic porphyrin-based materials for light harvesting are commonly studied and utilized for electronic energy transfer. The supramolecular assemblies typically employ coordination and hydrogen bonding as an efficient means of tuning interactions and directionality between donor chromophores and acceptor fluorophores. Zinc porphyrin is frequently coupled to free-base porphyrin in synthetic electronic energy transfer systems due to the separated absorption features of both of these molecules. The zinc porphyrin serves as the donor and the free-base porphyrin serves as the acceptor, since the fluorescence of the zinc porphyrin overlaps with the absorption of the free-base porphyrin. Porphyrin arrays and oligomers have been combined with charge-separation molecules in order to emulate charge-separation functions that are present in photosynthetic proteins, in addition to the light harvesting properties of biological light harvesting complexes. The charge-separation molecules that are usually combined with donor chromophore zinc metallated porphyrins are ferrocene which serves as an electron donor and fullerene which serves as an electron acceptor.

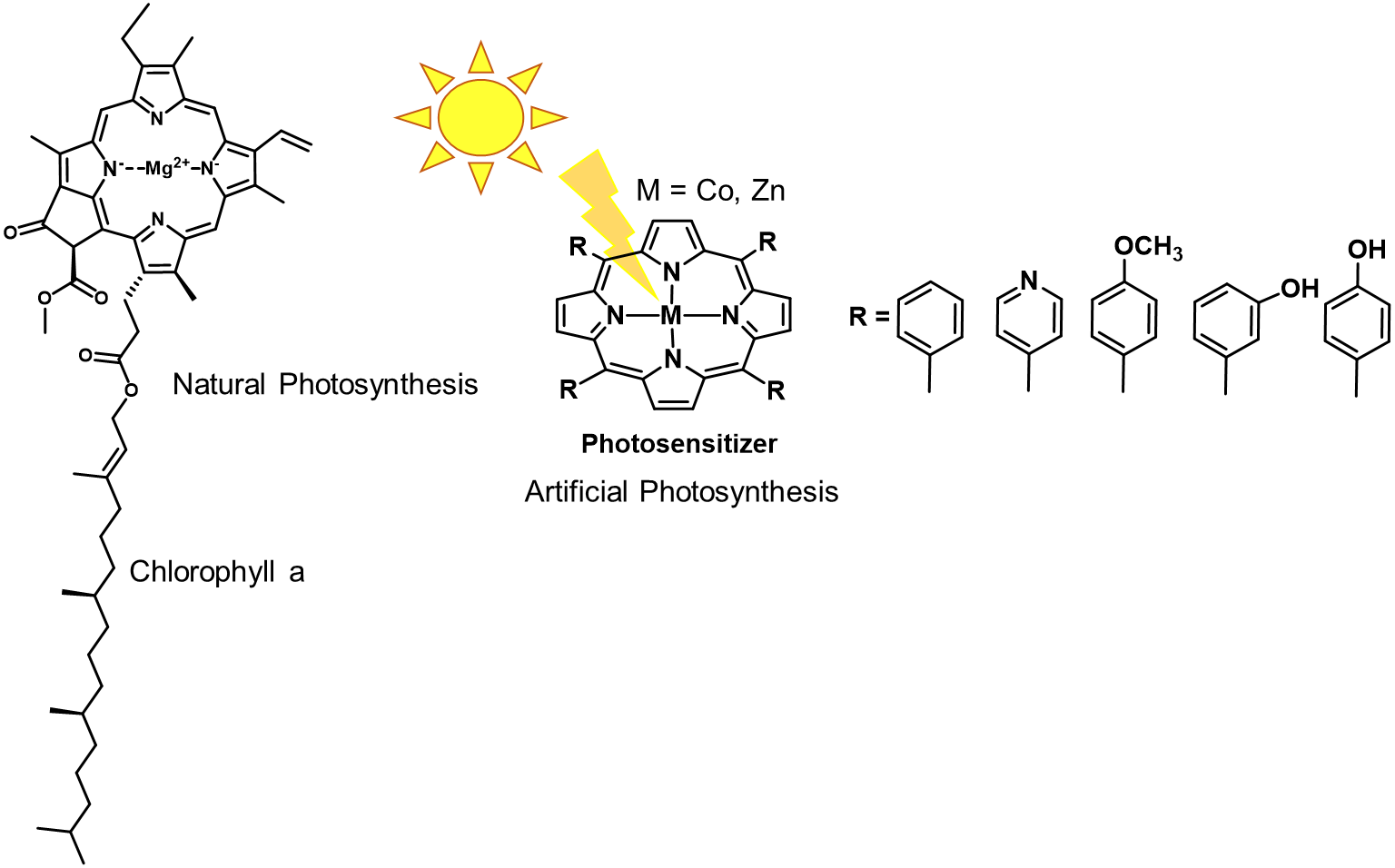
Molecular structures of Chlorophyll a, a light-harvesting pigment in green plants (left) and an artificial porphyrin photosensitizer system (right).

==== Carotenoid bioinspired materials ====
Carotenoids are another class of pigment/dye molecules found in retinal photoreceptors and biological light harvesting systems (e.g. Photosystem I, Photosystem II, and Light Harvesting Complex II). When finely arranged with chlorophylls in biological photosynthetic systems, carotenoids effectively promote photoinduced charge separation and electron transfer. Carotenoid is highly conjugated and is structurally very similar to polyacetylene oligomers. Naturally derived carotenoids have been combined with fullerene derivatives for photovoltaic applications. In photovoltaic devices, carotenoid molecules exhibited p-type semiconductor behavior since the molecular structure is very similar to polyacetylene. Artificial dyad and triad systems in which carotenoids are covalently bound have been able to mimic the charge separation and light harvesting mechanisms present in phototrophic organisms. Carotenoid that is covalently bound to porphyrin is a typical example of a dyad containing carotenoid, the dyad can then be covalently bound to a fullerene to form a triad (Figure 3). The triad systems display electron transport that results in long lasting charge separated states.

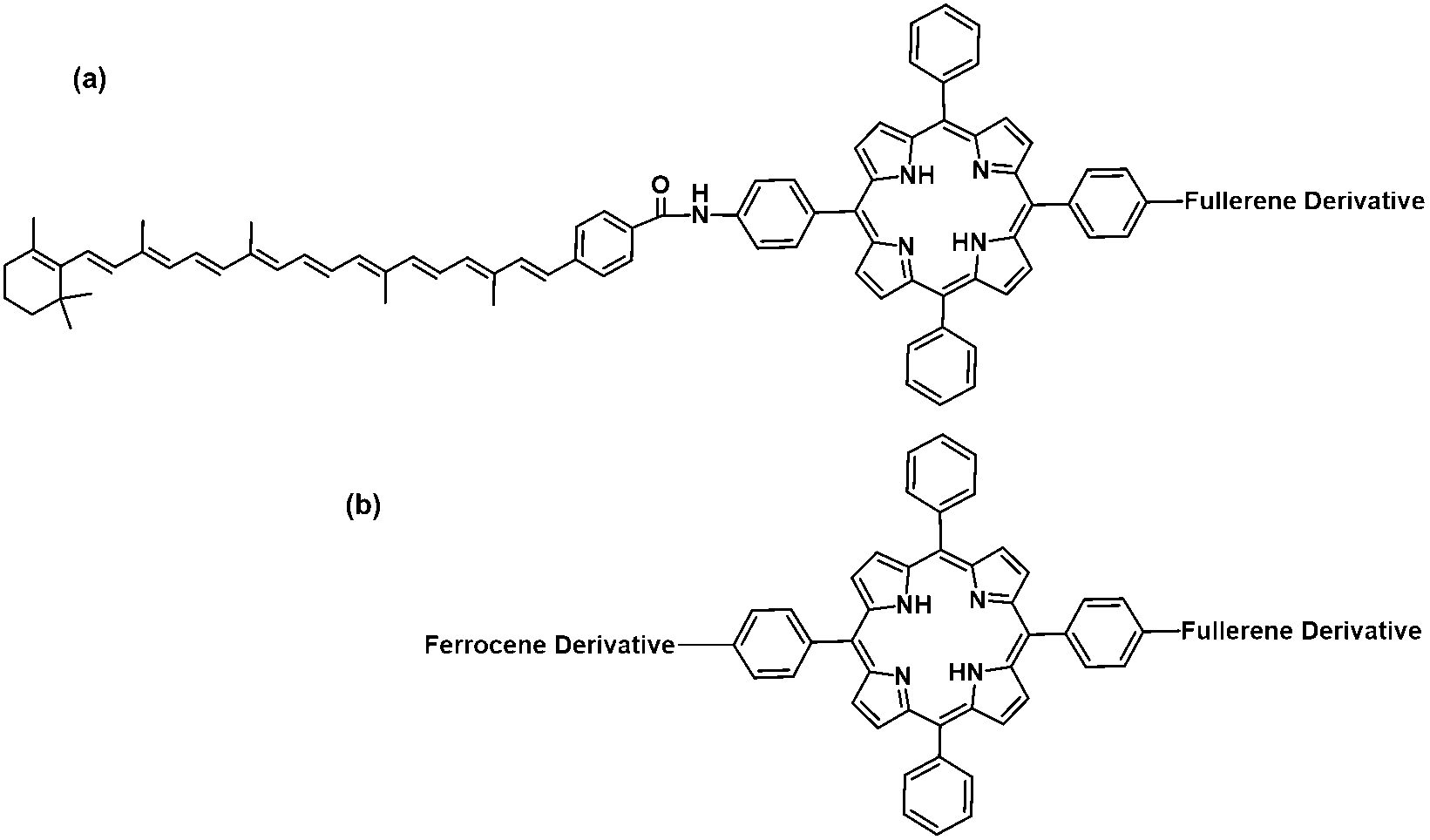
Figure 3: Triad Molecules containing Porphyrin Capable of Light Harvesting and Charge Separation A) Carotenoid, Porphyrin, and Fullerene Triad B) Ferrocene, Porphyrin, and Fullerene

=== Biomaterials ===
Natural light harvesting complexes contain proteins that combine through self-assembly with effective donor chromophores in order to promote light harvesting and energy transfer during photosynthesis; synthetic peptides can be designed to have optoelectronic properties that mimic this phenomenon in natural light harvesting complexes. Proteins in PPCs not only serve as a support for the arrangement of chromophores during light harvesting but also actively play a role in the photophysical dynamics of photosynthesis. Some biomimetic artificial light harvesting complexes have been designed to have proteins and peptides that self-assemble in such a way that chromophores in the complex are arranged for optimized light harvesting efficiency. Peptide self-assemblies and polypeptides modified with porphyrins have also been designed to have the dual function of charge separation and light harvesting. Other examples of peptide donor and acceptor chromophore conjugates utilize the self-assembly of amyloid fibrils into a beta sheet that allows the chromophores to become arranged in such a way that is fine tuned for efficient light harvesting. Synthetic peptides and proteins are one example of the biological materials that are utilized in artificial light harvesting systems, virus templated assemblies and DNA origami have also been employed for light harvesting applications.

=== Organic gels and nanocrystals ===
Reversible molecular organic gel networks are held together by noncovalent interactions (e.g. hydrogen bonding, π-stacking, van der Waals interactions and donor–acceptor interactions). The gelator molecules can self-organize in one-dimensional arrays due to the directional nature of intermolecular interactions, producing elongated fibrous structures that can serve as antenna molecules. The organic gels assemble in such a way that there is proper arrangement of donor and acceptor chromophores which is the principle requirement for efficient energy transfer. π-conjugated molecules are commonly used in organic gels since these molecules are impacted by the orientation of chromophores in self assemblies. Some examples of π-conjugated molecules that are employed in organic gels are oligo-p-phenylenevinylene, anthracene, pyrene and porphyrin derivatives.

Organic and Organometallic Nanocrystals (NCs) are promising for light harvesting and energy applications because NCs can be solubilized, demonstrate capability of absorbing a large fraction of the solar spectrum, and have a tunable band-gap due to quantum-confinement effects. Organic and organometallic crystals are commonly formed through noncovalent interactions, including hydrogen bonding, π–π stacking, and electrostatic interactions. Organic NCs can be composed of organic arrays that incorporate dye molecules such as boron dipyrromethene. Sun et al. developed two polymorphic organometallic nanocrystals formed from platinum (II)-β-diketonate complexes demonstrated light harvesting and photoluminescent properties. Zeolite nanocrystals that allow for the supramolecular organization of organic dye molecules have also been designed for light harvesting.

=== Dendrimers ===
Since the late 1990s a lot of emphasis has been placed on the design of supramolecular species that can partake as antenna molecules for artificial photosynthetic applications; many of these artificially designed antennas are dendrimers. Light harvesting dendritic molecular structures are designed to have a high abundance of light-collecting donor chromophores that transfer the energy to an energy "sink" at the center of dendrimer. An important consideration when designing dendrimers for light harvesting applications is that as the dendrimer generation increases, the number of terminal groups that serve as donor chromophores doubles; however, this results in an increased distance between the terminal groups and the energy acceptor core, thereby decreasing energy transfer efficiency. Dendrimers can contain a large number of chromophoric groups such as coumarin-based donor chromophores in highly ordered arrays to enable effective energy transfer. The core (energy acceptor) of dendrimer molecules can be functionalized with porphyrins, fullerenes and metal complexes. Some reported dendrimer systems can achieve up to 99% energy transfer, an example of a dendrimer that can achieve this efficiency has a perylene core and dendrimer branches composed of coumarin units.

=== Nanocomposites ===
Nanomaterials with tunable band gaps can be combined to form heterogeneous structures that self-assemble to form stable abiotic structures, that have potential in artificial photosynthesis and bionic vision. The electronic and physical properties of graphene based composites show promise for light energy conversion. One example of a graphene based composite employed negatively and positively charged graphene oxide multilayers, the layers stacked horizontally based on electrostatic interactions forming a horizontal heterostructure that was able to undergo light-ionic-energy conversion. Negatively charged graphene oxide can also be combined with positively charged polymer nanoparticles; the aggregation of polymers in polymer nanoparticles allows for a broader range for tunable responses to visible light when compared to pristine polymers. The high extinction coefficients of the polymer aggregates allow for enhanced light harvesting as well as charge separation. The delocalization of the electrons of the polymer nanoparticles combined with the graphene allows for π–π* transitions and the materials in the composite match energetically.

=== Organic and inorganic hybrids and inorganic nanomaterials ===
In organic and inorganic hybrid systems such as Organic-Inorganic Hybrid Perovskite and Metal–Organic Frameworks (MOFs), the organic–inorganic interface is a critical parameter that controls the performance of light-harvesting devices. Lead-halide perovskite materials demonstrate exceptional photophysical properties and have optoelectronic applications. Halide perovskite materials more generally, have high optical absorption characteristics and allow for charge transport, demonstrating these materials have potential for photovoltaic applications and solar energy conversion. MOFs can be designed to have solar light harvesting properties through different synthetic strategies such as using porphyrin containing struts or metalloporphyrins as the primary organic building blocks. MOFs may also be functionalized through surface modification with quantum dots, or through the embedding of photosensitive ruthenium or osmium metal complexes into the MOF structure.

Inorganic materials such as silicon nanostructures, inorganic oxide films (e.g. titanium oxide and indium oxide), and ultrathin two-dimensional inorganic materials (e.g. bismuth oxychloride, tin sulfide, and titanium sulfide nanosheets) have light harvesting and optoelectronic properties. Silicon is commonly used in solar cells and in 1954 Bell Labs invented the first effective silicon solar cell with an efficiency of 5%. The efficiency of the device that was invented by Bell Labs rapidly increased upon n-type and p-type doping and by 1961 reached an efficiency of 14.5%. Silicon is highly abundant, has extensive charge carrier mobility and high stability, allowing it to be widely used in photovoltaic and semiconductor applications. Currently the most efficient single junction device employing silicon has reached a solar conversion efficiency as high as 29.1%. Silicon nanostructures such as nanowires, nanocrystals, quantum dots, and porous nanoparticles have shown improvements over bulk or planar silicon due to enhanced charge separation and transfer, intrinsically higher specific volume, and surface curvature. Silicon nanostructures also allow for the quantum confinement effect which can improve light absorption ranges and light-induced responses.

Dye-sensitized solar cells frequently incorporate titanium dioxide as a principal component because it imparts sensitizer adsorption as well as charge separation and electron transport characteristics. The dye molecules present in dye-sensitized solar cells, upon light harvesting, transfer excited electrons to titanium dioxide which then separates the charge. Indium oxide sheets with oxygen vacancies have narrowed band gaps and enhanced charge carrier properties that allow for charge carrier separation efficiency making this material a potential candidate for light harvesting. Ultrathin bismuth oxychloride with oxygen vacancies also allows for enhanced light harvesting and charge separation properties.

== Applications ==
=== Photovoltaics ===
The field of organic photovoltaics in particular, has developed rapidly since the late 1990s and small solar cells have demonstrated power conversion efficiencies up to 13%. The abundance of solar power and the ability to leverage this for conversion to chemical energy via artificial photosynthesis can allow for mass renewable energy sources. Understanding the fundamental processes of photosynthesis in biological systems is important to the development of solar renewable sources. Light-induced charge separation in photosynthetic organisms, catalyzes the conversion of solar energy into chemical or metabolic energy and this has inspired the design of synthetic light-harvesting materials that can then be integrated into photovoltaic devices that generate electrical voltage and current upon absorption of photons. Excitonic networks are then formed for efficient energy transfer. Wide‐ranging molecular and solid‐state materials have applications in photovoltaics. In the design of photovoltaic devices, it is critical to take into account the effects of high pigment or chromophore concentration, the arrangement of chromophores, as well as the geometry of antenna moieties embedded in light harvesting devices, in order to optimize power generation and maximize quantum efficiency. One common form of chromophore within solar cells is that of dye-sensitized solar cells. The dynamic and responsive molecular machinery present in photosynthetic organisms as well as the principles of self-assembly has influenced the design of "smart" photovoltaic devices.

=== Photocatalysis ===
Semiconductive surfaces (e.g. metal oxides) functionalized with light harvesting materials (e.g. fullerenes, conductive polymers, porphyrin and phthalocyanine based systems, nanoparticles) can photocatalyze water oxidation or water dissociation in a photoanodic device. Solar energy conversion may be applied to photoelectrochemical water splitting. A majority of water-splitting systems employ inorganic semiconductor materials, however, organic semiconductor materials are gaining traction for this application. Oxynitrides and oxysulfides have also been designed for the photocatalysis of water degradation as well.

=== Photodynamic therapy ===
Photodynamic therapy is a medical treatment that employs photochemical processes, through the combination of light and a photosensitizer to generate a cytotoxic effect to cancerous or diseased tissue. Examples of photosensitizers or light harvesting materials that are used to target cancer cells are semiconductor nanoparticles, ruthenium complexes, and nanocomplexes. Photosensitizers can be used for the formation of singlet oxygen upon photoinduction and this plays an important role in photodynamic therapy and this capability has been displayed by titanium dioxide nanoparticles.

== See also ==
- Photosensitizer
- Photodynamic Therapy
- Photocatalysis
- Photoswitch
