= Octadecylphosphonic acid =

Names
- Preferred IUPAC name Octadecylphosphonic acid
- Other names n-Octadecylphosphonic acid, ODPA

Identifiers
CAS Number	4724-47-4
3D model (JSmol)	Interactive image
ChemSpider	70816
ECHA InfoCard	100.022.924
PubChem CID	78451
UNII	KDX6MSF5PN
CompTox Dashboard (EPA)	DTXSID5063574
- InChI: InChI=1S/C18H39O3P/c1-2-3-4-5-6-7-8-9-10-11-12-13-14-15-16-17-18-22(19,20)21/h2-18H2,1H3,(H2,19,20,21) Key: FTMKAMVLFVRZQX-UHFFFAOYSA-N; InChI=1/C18H39O3P/c1-2-3-4-5-6-7-8-9-10-11-12-13-14-15-16-17-18-22(19,20)21/h2-18H2,1H3,(H2,19,20,21) Key: FTMKAMVLFVRZQX-UHFFFAOYAI
- SMILES: CCCCCCCCCCCCCCCCCCP(=O)(O)O

Properties
Chemical formula	C_{18}H_{39}O_{3}P
Molar mass	334.474222 [g/mol]
Appearance	White to off-white powder
Melting point	95-100 °C
Solubility in water	Immiscible with water
- Except where otherwise noted, data are given for materials in their standard state (at 25 °C [77 °F], 100 kPa). Infobox references

Octadecylphosphonic acid (C_{18}H_{39}O_{3}P) is a chemical compound used in thermal paper for receipts, adding machines and tickets.
