= Tin sulfide =

Tin sulfide can refer to either of these chemical compounds:

- Tin(II) sulfide, SnS
- Tin(IV) sulfide, SnS_{2}
