= Antibacterial activity =

The shelf life of a product can be extended either by adding artificial preservatives or by taking hygienic measures during the manufacturing process. As the consumer trend today is towards preservative-free foods with a long shelf-life, industry is being forced to rethink its manufacturing methods. Instead of adding preservative agents, increased hygienic precautions can be taken during production. A clean and hygienic manufacturing environment is an essential prerequisite in order to keep contamination-related reject rates low. The utilization of surfaces in the manufacturing environment with antibacterial properties can significantly reduce contamination risks.

The determination of the antibacterial activity (microbicidy) of surfaces is described in the following norms: ISO 22196 and JIS Z 2801. The Japanese norm JIS Z 2801 was published in 2000 and published again in 2007 as the internationally valid norm ISO 22196. Therefore, ISO 22196 and JIS Z 2801 are identical. In the test, both a surface system coated with sporicide and an identical surface system without an antibacterial coating are charged with selected microorganisms.

A once-only assessment of the reduction factor is carried out after 24 hours by determining colony counts on the reference surface and on the antibacterial surface.
