= Elephant apple =

Elephant apple is a common name for several plants with edible fruits and may refer to:

- Dillenia indica, a species of Dillenia native to China and tropical Asia
- Dillenia philippinensis, a favorite tree among Filipino garden enthusiasts
- Limonia acidissima, the only species within the monotypic genus Limonia
