= Sink (disambiguation) =

A sink is a bowl-shaped fixture used for washing hands or small objects.

Sink may also refer to:

== Music ==
- Sink (Floater album), an album released by rock band Floater in September 1994.
- Sink (Foetus album), an album released by solo musical project Foetus Inc in October 1989.
- Sink, a late 80s/early 90s UK punk band led by Ed Wenn after leaving The Stupids.

== People ==
- Alex Sink (born 1948), Adelaide "Alex" Sink, Chief Financial Officer of the state of Florida
- Mark Sink, (born 1958), American photographer
- Robert Sink (1905–1965), senior United States Army officer
- Sadie Sink (born 2002), American actress
- Sink Izumi, the lead character in the anime series Dog Days

== Science ==
- Sources and sinks, a general term used in science
- Sink (computing), an object implementing the interface to receive incoming events
- Sink (geography), an area of dry land below sea-level
- Sink (graph theory), a vertex with 0 out-degree
- Sink, a point where the divergence of a vector field is negative
- Sink, a flow network node that has more incoming flow than the outgoing flow
- Sink condition (pharmaceutics), a required condition during chemical dissolution tests
- Sink, or attractor, in dynamical systems (mathematics)
- Sinkhole, a natural depression or hole caused by chemical dissolution of carbonate rocks
- Heat sink, a component or assembly that transfers heat generated within a solid material to a fluid medium

== Other uses ==
- Sink (champagne), the act of pouring out the champagne in the sink
- Sink OFC, a term for an offshore financial center

== See also ==
- Sinking (disambiguation)
- Sinks Canyon State Park, a Wyoming state park located in the Wind River Mountains
- Carbon dioxide sink
- Synch (disambiguation)
- Lincoln Burrows or Linc the Sink, a character in Prison Break
