= Sinking (disambiguation) =

Sinking may refer to:

- Sinking of a ship; see shipwrecking
- Sinking of land; see subsidence
- Being submerged
- Sinking (album), a 1996 studio album by The Aloof
- Sinking (behavior), the act of pouring out champagne in the sink
- Sinking (metalworking), a metalworking technique
- Sinking (novella), a 1921 novella by Yu Dafu
- "Sinking", a song by No Doubt from the album No Doubt (No Doubt album)
- "Sinking", a song by Jars of Clay from the album Jars of Clay (album)
- Sinking Creek (disambiguation), several creeks
- Well drilling
- Shaft sinking, the process of digging a shaft in shaft mining

== See also ==
- Sink condition (pharmaceutics), a required condition during chemical dissolution tests
- Sink (disambiguation)
- Xinjing (disambiguation), also romanized as Hsinking
