= Silicon organic water repellent =

Chemical additive

Silicone hydrophobic powder (SHP), is a versatile chemical additive known for its remarkable water-repellent properties. It is a fine, white powder composed of silicone polymer, a synthetic polymer known for its unique combination of flexibility, stability, and resistance to various environmental factors.

== Chemistry ==
Commercially available siliconates include potassium methyl siliconate (CAS 31795-24-1, CH_{5}KO_{3}Si) and sodium methyl siliconate (CAS 16589-43-8, CH_{5}NaO_{3}Si). These are supplied as a concentrate in water with an active content of between 30% and 40% by weight. This solution is further diluted in water prior to their application by spraying, dipping or rolling to a mineral building material, such as brickwork, to make the surface water-repellent. The dilution is clear and stable with a high pH of 13 to 14. When applied to a surface, the siliconate reacts with carbon dioxide in the air to form an insoluble water-resistant treatment within 24 hours.

CH_{5}KO_{3}Si + silanol functional substrate OHSi → CH_{4}O_{3}Si + KOH

The methyl group has now attached itself to the substrata.

2KOH + CO_{2} → K_{2}CO_{3} + H_{2}O

The salts formed by this reaction are often the cause of white efflorescence when too much of the solution is applied to the surface.

== Types and applications ==
=== Purpose of application ===
The water-repelling liquid is applied to provide the surface of materials with excellent water-resistance, make the material frost- and corrosion-resistant, block UV and infrared radiation, and reduce pollution of the surface. As a result, it preserves the appearance and extends the service life of the material. It can also prevent surface mosses and lichens.

The treated surface does not change its appearance and maintains air permeability (the material is not sweated and retains the ability to output pairs).

=== Methyl hydride siloxane ===
A light-yellow to colorless liquid containing methyl hydride siloxane polymer is commonly used. Methyl hydride siloxane is readily dissoluble in aromatic and chlorinated hydrocarbons, and undergoes gelation in the presence of amines, amino alcohols, strong acids and alkalis. It is insoluble in lower alcohols and water.

=== Oligo methyl hydride siloxane ===
A water-based emulsion of oligo methyl hydride siloxane has properties and applications similar to methyl hydride siloxane. Since this form is a water emulsion, it can be applied as an additive in the production of solutions and mixtures by a volumetric method.

==== Applications ====
Oligo methyl hydride siloxane emulsion is added to concrete, asbestos, gypsum, ceramic, porcelain. It is used in the production of waterproof papers, leather, and water-resistant fabrics. It is also used as plasticizer in the preparation of plaster, lime and cement solutions. It can be added as an air-involving admixture in the preparation of cement solution.

The volumetric method is used in the manufacture of paving tiles, slabs, curbs, and fences of different silicate materials.

=== Tetra ethoxy silane and polyethoxy siloxanes ===
A liquid containing a mixture of tetra ethoxy silane and polyethoxy siloxanes is also used.

==== Applications ====
- Metal manufacture: binding agent in the manufacture of ceramic molds for precision core-mold casting; manufacture of rods exposed to high temperatures; manufacture of non-stick paints.
- Textile industry: feltproofing of woolen cloths; abatement of carpet shrinkage; antirot and antidust protection of carpets; impregnating compound for filter cloths.
- Construction engineering: hydrophobization of construction materials, treatment of coated surfaces; porosity decreasing impregnation of concrete; manufacture of acid-resistant cement.
- Glasswork and cerarnics: antireflection treatment of optical glass; application of light-diffusing coat to electric light bulbs; binding agent for ceramic mixtures, resistant to strongly corrosive mediums, with high manufacture of fireproof material standing temperatures of about 1750 °C and stress of above 127 kg/cm3.
- Coating industry: paint additives forming quick-drying, thermostable and water-resistant coats with constant gloss.

== See also ==
- Hydrophobe
- Amphiphile
- Froth flotation
- Hydrophile
- Hydrophobic effect
- Hydrophobicity scales
- Superhydrophobe
- Superhydrophobic coating
