= Droplet superpropulsion =

Physics of superpropulsion in droplets and soft elastic solids

Droplet superpropulsion is a physics phenomenon where liquid droplets or soft elastic materials can launch much faster than rigid objects when driven at specific frequencies. By matching an object's natural oscillation modes, energy can be stored and then released rapidly, resulting in higher launch speeds. This principle, called one-shot resonance, has been observed in insects like the glassy-winged sharpshooter and has applications in soft robotics, anti-icing surfaces, and new material designs. Research published in Nature Communications and Physical Review Letters describes how droplets and soft solids achieve this efficient propulsion by harnessing surface tension and elasticity.

== Physical mechanism ==
Superpropulsion arises when an object, such as a droplet, dynamically deforms under external acceleration, temporarily storing elastic energy dominated by surface tension before releasing it suddenly to generate forward motion. This resonance-based energy transfer allows the object to attain greater propulsion efficiency than a rigid body.

In liquid droplets, the natural oscillation timescale is described by the Rayleigh time:

$$\tau_R = \left( \frac{\rho R^3}{\gamma} \right)^{1/2}$$

where:

- $\tau_R$ is the Rayleigh time,
- $\rho$ is the droplet density,
- $R$ is the droplet radius,
- $\gamma$ is the surface tension.

The associated Rayleigh frequency is:

$$f_R = \frac{1}{2\pi} \left( \frac{8\gamma}{3\pi \rho R^3} \right)^{1/2}$$

Superpropulsion occurs when the actuator frequency $f_d$ is approximately one-third of the droplet's natural Rayleigh frequency:

$$f_d \approx \frac{f_R}{3}$$

This condition, referred to as a "one-shot resonance", enables maximum energy transfer, resulting in ejection speeds up to 2.5 times higher than the maximum speed of the actuator itself.

== Biological example ==
In nature, droplet superpropulsion has been discovered in sharpshooter insects (Cicadellidae). These millimeter-sized insects expel xylem sap waste droplets using a catapult-like anal stylus. By matching the stylus oscillation frequency to the Rayleigh oscillation frequency of the surface-tension dominated droplets, sharpshooters achieve superpropulsion with a velocity ratio $\lambda > 1$.

== Engineered systems ==
Laboratory experiments demonstrate similar superpropulsion effects. Raufaste et al. (2017) showed that water droplets on vibrating superhydrophobic surfaces undergo amplified ejection when the driving frequency matches internal capillary oscillation modes.

Furthermore, adding a soft, elastic layer to rigid projectiles can improve propulsion efficiency, as the elastic deformation temporarily stores energy, then releases it during launch.

Simple soft robotic jumpers have been designed following similar principles. Incorporating spring-like materials into jumping robots or projectiles leads to enhanced kinetic energy transfer and higher jumping heights.

== See also ==
- Surface tension
- Soft matter physics
- Rayleigh–Plateau instability
- Resonance
- Leidenfrost effect
- Elasticity (physics)
