= Asynchrony =

Asynchrony is any dynamic far from synchronization. If and as parts of an asynchronous system become more synchronized, those parts or even the whole system can be said to be in sync.

Asynchrony or asynchronous may refer to:

== Electronics and computing ==
- Asynchrony (computer programming), the occurrence of events independent of the main program flow, and ways to deal with such events
  - Async/await
- Asynchronous system, a system having no global clock, instead operating under distributed control
  - Asynchronous circuit, a sequential digital logic circuit not governed by a clock circuit or signal
  - Asynchronous communication, transmission of data without the use of an external clock signal
- Asynchronous cellular automaton, a mathematical model of discrete cells which update their state independently
- Asynchronous operation, a sequence of operations executed out of time coincidence with any event
- Asynchronous I/O, an Input and Output operations that allow a program to continue executing other tasks without waiting for data to be transferred.

== Other uses ==
- Asynchrony (game theory), when players in games update their strategies at different time intervals
- Asynchronous learning, an educational method in which the teacher and student are separated in time
- Asynchronous motor, a type of electric motor
- Asynchronous multiplayer, a form of multiplayer gameplay in video games
- Asynchronous muscles, muscles in which there is no one-to-one relationship between stimulation and contraction
- Collaborative editing or asynchronous editing, the practice of groups producing works together through individual contributions

== See also ==
- async (album), 2017 album by Japanese musician and composer Ryuichi Sakamoto
- Async Research Institute, a fictional organization in Kane Parsons's Backrooms web series and its film adaptation
