= Sync =

Sync, or synch, is a clipping of synchrony or of synchronization, the coordination of events to keep them in time. The opposite of synchrony is asynchrony.

Sync or synch may also refer to:

== Computing and technology ==
- Sync (Unix), a command and a system call for Unix-like operating systems
- Data synchronization, keeping multiple copies of a dataset in coherence with one another
- File synchronization or syncing, to synchronize directories or files on computers
- Browser synchronization, cloud service provided by web browser vendors for users to synchronize settings and data on multiple devices
- Microsoft Sync Framework, a data synchronization platform from Microsoft
- Resilio Sync (formerly BitTorrent Sync), a peer-to-peer file synchronization tool
- Synchronization (computer science), relates to similar principles of synchronization of processes or data
- Syncthing, an open source peer-to-peer file synchronization tool
- SyncToy, a Microsoft PowerToy's software for file synchronization
- Syncword, in computer networks, used to synchronize a data transmission by indicating the end of header information and the start of data

== Electricity and electronics ==
- Sync, a signal used in composite video systems to coordinate the timings of lines, fields and frames
- DIN sync, a standard interface for electronic music instruments
- Ford Sync, an in-car communications and entertainment system
- Oscillator sync, where a slave oscillator is reset by a master oscillator
- Synchronization (alternating current), the process of matching the speed and frequency of a generator or other source to a running network

== Science ==
- Syncoilin, a protein encoded by the gene SYNC

== Arts, entertainment and media ==
=== Fictional entities ===
- Synch (character), a Marvel Comics superhero character
- Sync, an enemy character in Tales of the Abyss; see List of Tales of the Abyss episodes
- Sync (film), an Indian Tamil horror thriller film

=== Other uses in arts, entertainment, and media ===
- Synch (band), 1980s band who performed "Where Are You Now"
- SYNC (also referred to as "Audiobooks for Teens", or "SyncYA"), a summer giveaway program sponsored by AudioFile magazine
- Sync (2010), a video installation by Max Hattler
- The Sync, a defunct American webcasting company
- Sync music, another term for production music
- Synchronization rights, an example of a music license, defined by a synchronization license

== See also ==
- Sink (disambiguation)
- Syncopated
- Syncro (disambiguation)
