= Mountain America Stadium =

Football stadium in Tempe, Arizona, U.S.

- "House of Heat"
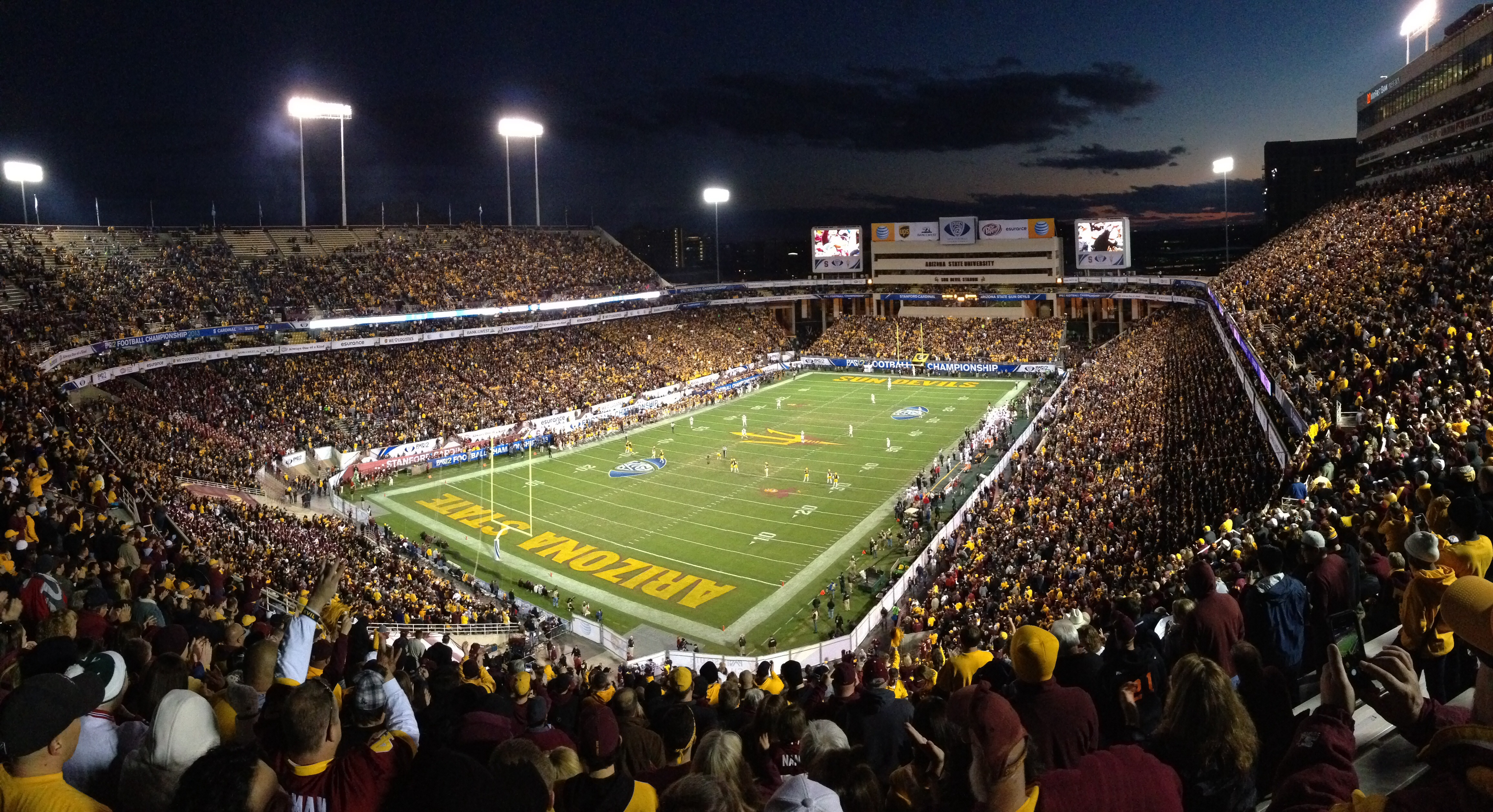
- Sun Devil Stadium hosting the 2013 Pac-12 Football Championship Game

- Location within the United States Location within Arizona
- Interactive map of Mountain America Stadium
- Former names: Sun Devil Stadium (1958–2023)
- Address: 500 East Veterans Way
- Location: Arizona State University; Tempe, Arizona, U.S.
- Coordinates: 33°25′35″N 111°55′57″W
- Elevation: 1,160 feet (350 m) AMSL
- Owner: Arizona State University
- Operator: Arizona State University
- Capacity: 53,599 (2018–present)
- Surface: Bermuda grass
- Public transit: Veterans Way / College Ave

Construction
- Groundbreaking: January 1958
- Opened: October 4, 1958; 68 years ago
- Renovated: 2015–2018
- Expanded: 1966, 1970, 1976, 1977, 1989
- Cost: $1 million (original stadium) ($11.2 million in 2025)
- Architect: Edward L. Varney Associates (original) HNTB/Gould Evans (renovation)
- General contractor: F. H. Antrim Construction Company (original) Hunt/Sundt JV (renovation)

Tenants
- Arizona State Sun Devils (NCAA) (1958–present); Fiesta Bowl (NCAA) (1971–2006); Arizona Wranglers (USFL) (1983–1984); Arizona Outlaws (USFL) (1985); Phoenix/Arizona Cardinals (NFL) (1988–2005); Cactus Bowl (NCAA) (2006–2015, 2026-present); Arizona Hotshots (AAF) (2019)

Website
- thesundevils.com/sun-devil-stadium

Mountain America Stadium is an outdoor college football stadium in Tempe, Arizona, United States, located on the campus of Arizona State University (ASU). It is the home of the Arizona State Sun Devils football team of the Big 12 Conference. The stadium opened in 1958. The stadium's seating capacity as of 2018 is 53,599, reduced from a peak of 74,865 in 1989. (Note: In 2022, the university's website lists the capacity of the stadium at 75,000. See "ASU Virtual Tour: Sun Devil Stadium")

The stadium is officially named Mountain America Stadium, Home of the ASU Sun Devils. It was named Sun Devil Stadium until 2023. The natural grass playing surface within the stadium was named Frank Kush Field in 1996 in honor of the former coach of the team. The stadium underwent a five-year, $304-million renovation that was completed in August 2019.

The stadium has hosted two annual college football bowl games: the Fiesta Bowl from 1971 to 2006, and the Cactus Bowl from 2006 to 2015. The stadium was the home of the Phoenix/Arizona Cardinals of the National Football League (NFL) from 1988 through the 2005 season, when the Cardinals moved into their own stadium in Glendale. It was the only major football stadium in the Phoenix metropolitan area until the opening of State Farm Stadium.

== Construction and upgrades ==
Built in 1958, the stadium's original capacity was 30,000. The first major renovation, in 1976, substantially raised the capacity to 57,722. Seating was added to the south end zone, along with press and sky boxes. A year later, in 1977, the upper tier was completed to bring seating to 70,311. In 1988, 1,700 more seats were added. During that time the Carson Student Athlete Center was added to the south end. The building is the home of the ASU Athletic Department.

Years	Capacity
2018–present	53,599
2017	57,078
2016	56,232
2015	64,248
2014	65,870
2004–2013	71,706
1996–2003	73,379
1992–1995	73,473
1989–1991	74,865
1987–1988	70,491
1983–1986	70,021
1980–1982	70,330
1978–1979	70,311
1976–1977	57,722
1970–1975	50,300
1966–1969	41,000
1958–1965	30,450

In 2007, engineers realized the stadium's concrete base was buckling due to rusting of structural steel supporting the foundation. Stadium designers had failed to account for the need to waterproof the structure when it was built, assuming that a stadium in the desert would not need hydrophobic concrete. However, they did not take into account that cleaning/maintenance crews for ASU (and later, the Cardinals) would use pressure washers with chemicals, to clean the seats and rows of the stadium after every game and event. The 1958 designers had also not foreseen the stadium, designed for limited Saturdays and college events per year in what was then a small market, would become the home of an NFL team, a major college bowl game and multiple concerts by the early 2000s as the Valley's growth exploded over the ensuing 50 years. This exposed the stadium to more water and overall structural wear than the designers had envisioned. Engineers estimated $45 million in repairs would be needed to maintain the stadium beyond 2010.

Legislation allowed the Arizona Board of Regents to set up a district on ASU property to collect revenue from local businesses. Money from the fee would fund renovation of ASU's athletic facilities, including the stadium. It was estimated the fund would accumulate enough money to begin planning renovations within 2–5 years (2012–2015).

In April 2012, Sun Devil Athletics unveiled an estimated $300-million plan to renovate Sun Devil Stadium that reduced stadium capacity to the 55,000–60,000 seat range, as well as adding field turf and fabric roof shading. An initial plan to add a roof was later scrapped to control costs. In October 2013, Sun Devil Athletics announced the removal of approximately 5,700 north endzone upper-deck seats to reduce the stadium capacity to 65,870 for the 2014 season. The Cactus Bowl, which had been played in Sun Devil Stadium, was moved to nearby Chase Field in 2016 so the renovations could take place.

The renovations were originally intended to consist of three phases that would take place between football seasons, thus removing the need for the team to play one or more years at a temporary home venue. Initial plans called for the entire project to be completed in time for the 2017 season, but modifications to the renovation schedule postponed the completion date to 2019. Designers for the renovation were HNTB Corp. and Gould Evans. The construction work was handled jointley by Hunt Construction Group and Sundt Construction, Inc.

- Phase 1 (2015): Sections of the upper deck were removed. The bleachers behind the south end zone were replaced with a steel and concrete structure.
- Phase 2 (2016): The west side of the lower bowl and loge level was demolished and rebuilt. Construction began on an athletic facility at the north end of the stadium.
- Phase 3 (2017): Completion of the athletic facility and installation of a new video board above the north end zone.
- Phase 4 (2018): The east side of the lower bowl was rebuilt.
- Phase 5 (2019): Club areas were completed.

The new scoreboard was the eighth largest in college football at the time of its installation, slightly wider than that of Arizona Stadium, the home of the rival University of Arizona Wildcats football team. The Coca-Cola Sun Deck, a small standing-only concert venue, is located on the north side of the stadium. The 365 ASU Community Union was created for non-football events, including concerts, movie nights, yoga, and community events.

On August 2, 2023, the university announced that Mountain America Credit Union had secured a 15-year naming rights deal for the stadium, which would be renamed "Mountain America Stadium, Home of the ASU Sun Devils".

== College football ==
The first game played at the stadium was on October 4, 1958. Arizona State defeated West Texas State 16–13.

On September 21, 1996, the playing surface was named "Frank Kush Field" in honor of notable former ASU football coach Frank Kush. That night ASU shut out #1 Nebraska 19–0. Kush became head coach in the same year Sun Devil Stadium opened; reflecting the Sun Devils' rise to prominence under his watch, the stadium's capacity more than doubled during his 21-year tenure. The largest crowd ever seated for a college football game at the stadium was 80,470 for the 1999 Fiesta Bowl, where the Tennessee Volunteers beat the Florida State Seminoles, 23–16 on January 4, 1999, to win the National Championship.

Sun Devil Stadium hosted the Fiesta Bowl from 1971 to 2006. During the 1998 and 2002 seasons, the Fiesta Bowl doubled as the BCS National Championship Game.

The Cactus Bowl (formerly called the Buffalo Wild Wings, Insight and Copper Bowl) moved to Sun Devil Stadium from Chase Field in 2006, after the Fiesta Bowl relocated to the newly opened State Farm Stadium in Glendale. As mentioned above, the bowl returned to Chase Field after the stadium renovations began; it has remained there ever since but will return to the stadium in 2026.

== Professional football ==
The first professional football game played in the stadium was a National Football League (NFL) preseason game between the New York Jets and the Minnesota Vikings in 1975. The NFL returned to the stadium in 1987 when the Green Bay Packers played the Denver Broncos in a preseason game.

Sun Devil Stadium was the home stadium of the Arizona Wranglers/Outlaws of the USFL from 1983 to 1985.

The facility became an NFL stadium in 1988 when the St. Louis Cardinals moved west to Arizona and became the Phoenix Cardinals, renamed the Arizona Cardinals in 1994. The Cardinals' first regular season game in the stadium was a 17–14 loss to the Dallas Cowboys in a Monday Night Football game on September 12, 1988. The Cardinals won their next home game, defeating the defending Super Bowl champion Washington Redskins 30–21. The Cardinals intended to only play in Sun Devil Stadium temporarily until a new stadium could be built in Phoenix. However, the savings and loan crisis derailed plans for a permanent home, and the Cardinals remained in Tempe for 18 years. In the latter part of that time, the Cardinals began chafing at being merely a tenant in a college-owned stadium; they felt it denied them access to revenue streams that other NFL teams took for granted. The 18 seasons the Cardinals spent at ASU are by far the longest a professional football team has been a tenant in a college stadium since the formation of the American Football League in 1960.

The stadium hosted Super Bowl XXX in 1996 as the Cowboys won their fifth Vince Lombardi Trophy, defeating the Pittsburgh Steelers, 27–17 in front of 76,347 spectators.

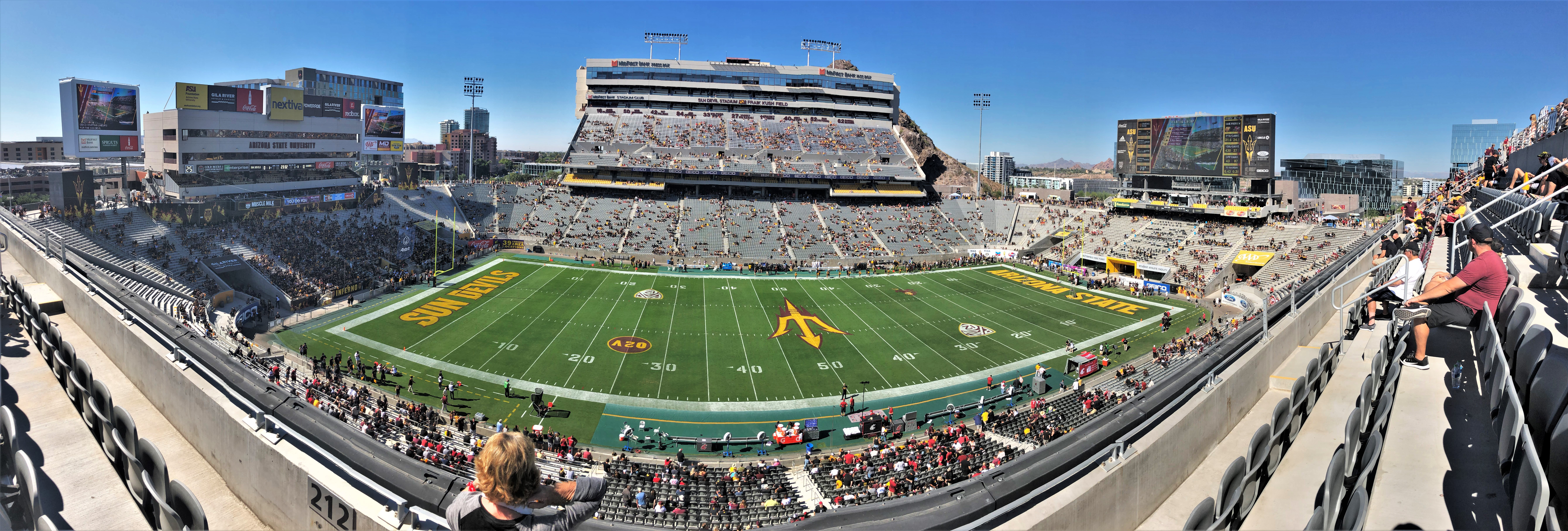
A panoramic view of the interior of the stadium before a rare Sun Devil day game from the east seats, looking towards the press box

On October 27, 2003, the Monday Night Football game between the San Diego Chargers and Miami Dolphins was moved to Sun Devil Stadium because the Cedar Fire in the San Diego area forced the teams to vacate Qualcomm Stadium, which was being used as an evacuation site. Tickets for the game were free and the capacity crowd saw the Dolphins win 26–10. It was the first Monday Night Football game in the stadium in four years.

The Cardinals ended their tenancy at Sun Devil Stadium with a 27–21 victory over the Philadelphia Eagles on Christmas Eve 2005. In 18 seasons, the Cardinals compiled a 64–80 (.444) record at the facility, their best home record being 5–3 which they achieved four times: 1994, 1996, 1998, and 2004. The 1998 season was the only season the Cardinals qualified for the playoffs during their stay in the stadium.

Whenever the Cardinals struggled, Sun Devil Stadium was frequently one of the quietest stadiums in the league. Cardinals home games often did not sell out in time for them to be aired locally, in compliance with NFL blackout policy at the time. The few fans who did show up for games were most often rooting for the visiting team, creating what amounted to "home games" on the road for many opposing teams, a situation most prevalent with the fans of the Dallas Cowboys, who were in the same division with the Cardinals (the NFC East, an artifact of their former St. Louis home) until the Cardinals moved to the NFC West in the 2002 season and often de facto had a home-field advantage for their yearly road game in Tempe. A percentage of the state's residents only live there during the winter and live elsewhere for the rest of the year, and many of Arizona's permanent residents either grew up in other states or have roots outside the state. In 2005, for instance, all home games (except for the 49ers game which was held at Estadio Azteca in Mexico City) failed to sell out and could not be broadcast on local television.

The stadium was subject to the Arizona Board of Regents and Tempe's guidelines regarding alcohol sales, as the stadium could not sell beer outside of the skyboxes and occasional test sells in certain stadium sections, and it remained a long-term source of friction between the school and the Cardinals, including disputes over alcohol revenue and advertising as sales were relaxed.

In 2006, the Cardinals moved from Sun Devil Stadium to Cardinals Stadium in another Phoenix suburb, Glendale, located on the opposite side of the metro area from Tempe (although the Cardinals' training facility is in Tempe). The new stadium also hosts the Fiesta Bowl, and hosted the first stand-alone BCS National Championship Game in January 2007.

The stadium was also home to a new professional football team, the Arizona Hotshots. The team began play in February 2019 and was a part of the Alliance of American Football, but the league folded in April 2019.

== Papal appearance ==
Pope John Paul II visited Phoenix on September 14, 1987, as a part of his whirlwind tour of the United States. In Tempe, he held Mass for 75,000 at Sun Devil Stadium, which had all images and textual mentions of the Sun Devil mascot and nickname removed or covered for the occasion.

== In popular cultures ==
Sun Devil Stadium has been the setting for a number of films:

- 1976: A Star is Born, with Barbra Streisand and Kris Kristofferson
- 1980: Used Cars
- 1982: The Rolling Stones' Let's Spend the Night Together (December 13, 1981)
- 1987: The Coen Brothers' Raising Arizona
- 1988: U2's rockumentary Rattle and Hum (December 19–20, 1987)
- 1996: Cameron Crowe's Jerry Maguire.

On television, the stadium was featured on the finale episode of The Amazing Race 4 (2003), and in The U on ESPN's 30 for 30 series (2009).

== See also ==
- List of NCAA Division I FBS football stadiums

Events and tenants
Preceded by none	Home of the Tostitos Fiesta Bowl; 1971–2005	Succeeded by University of Phoenix Stadium
Preceded by Bank One Ballpark	Home of the Insight Bowl; 2006–2015	Succeeded by Chase Field
Preceded by Busch Memorial Stadium	Home of the Arizona Cardinals; 1988–2005	Succeeded by Cardinals Stadium
Preceded by Joe Robbie Stadium	Host of the Super Bowl; XXX 1996	Succeeded by Louisiana Superdome
Preceded by first stadium Rose Bowl	Home of the BCS National Championship Game; 1999; 2003	Succeeded by Louisiana Superdome; Louisiana Superdome
