= Synchro (disambiguation) =

A synchro is a kind of rotary electric motor. Synchro may also refer to:

== Sports ==
- Synchromesh, an automobile dog clutch synchronizer mechanism
- Synchronized skating, an ice skating discipline
- Synchronized swimming
- Synchronized trampoline

== Software ==
- Synchro software, traffic modeling software

== See also ==
- Syncro (disambiguation)
