= Sink condition =

In pharmaceutics, sink condition is a term mostly related to the dissolution testing procedure.

It means using a sheer volume of solvent, usually about 5 to 10 times greater than the volume present in the saturated solution of the targeted chemical (often the API, and sometimes the excipients) contained in the dosage form being tested.

During the dissolution testing, "sink condition" is a mandatory requirement, otherwise when the concentration begins to get too close to the saturation point, even though the total soluble amount still remains constant, the dissolution rate will gradually begin to reduce in significant amounts, enough to corrupt the test results.

== See also ==
- Absorption (pharmacokinetics)
- Dissolution testing
- Pharmaceutical formulation
- Tablet (pharmacy)
- Tablet hardness testing
