= Hydrophobic effect =

Aggregation of non-polar molecules in aqueous solutions

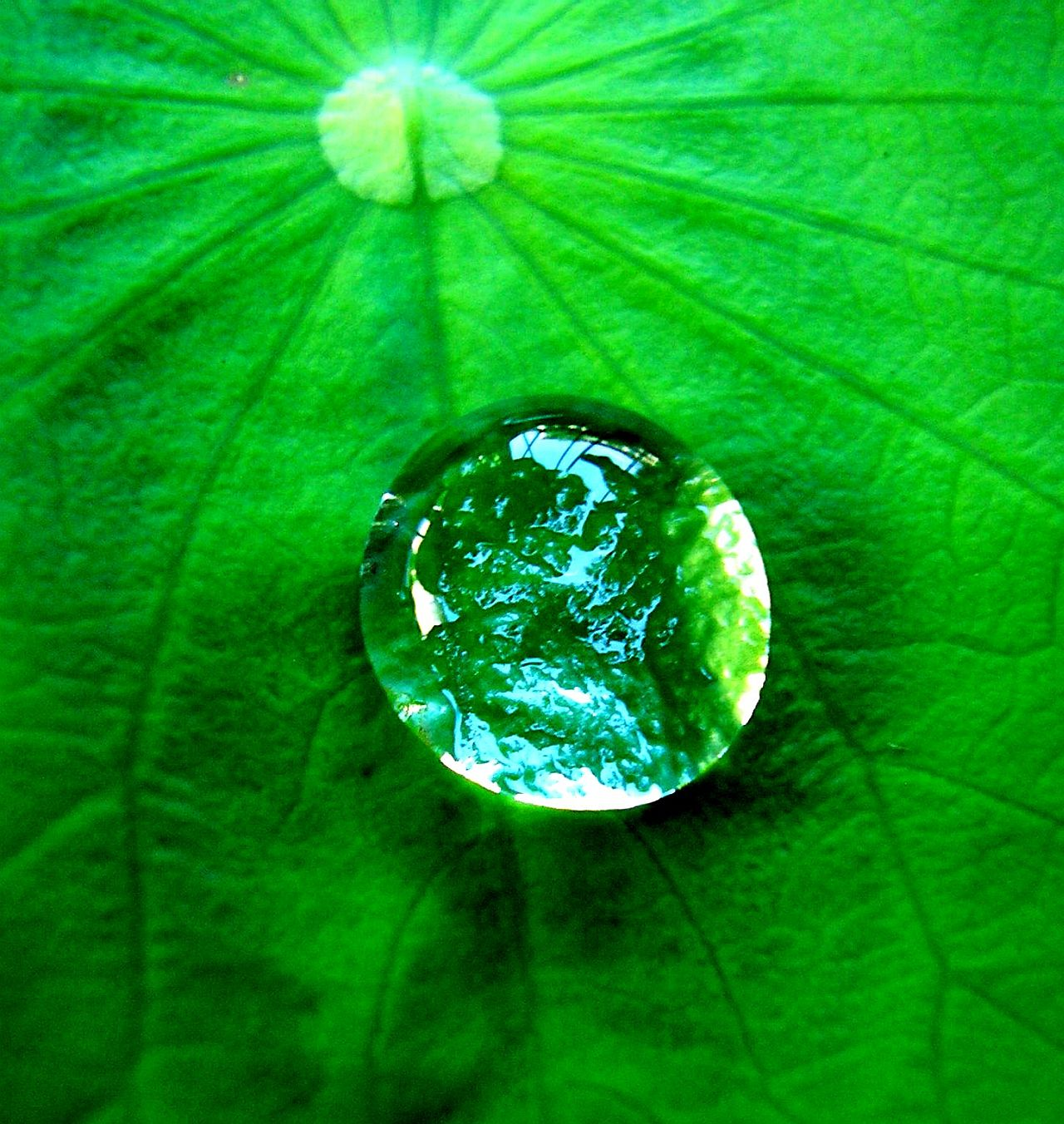
A droplet of water forms a spherical shape, minimizing contact with the hydrophobic leaf.

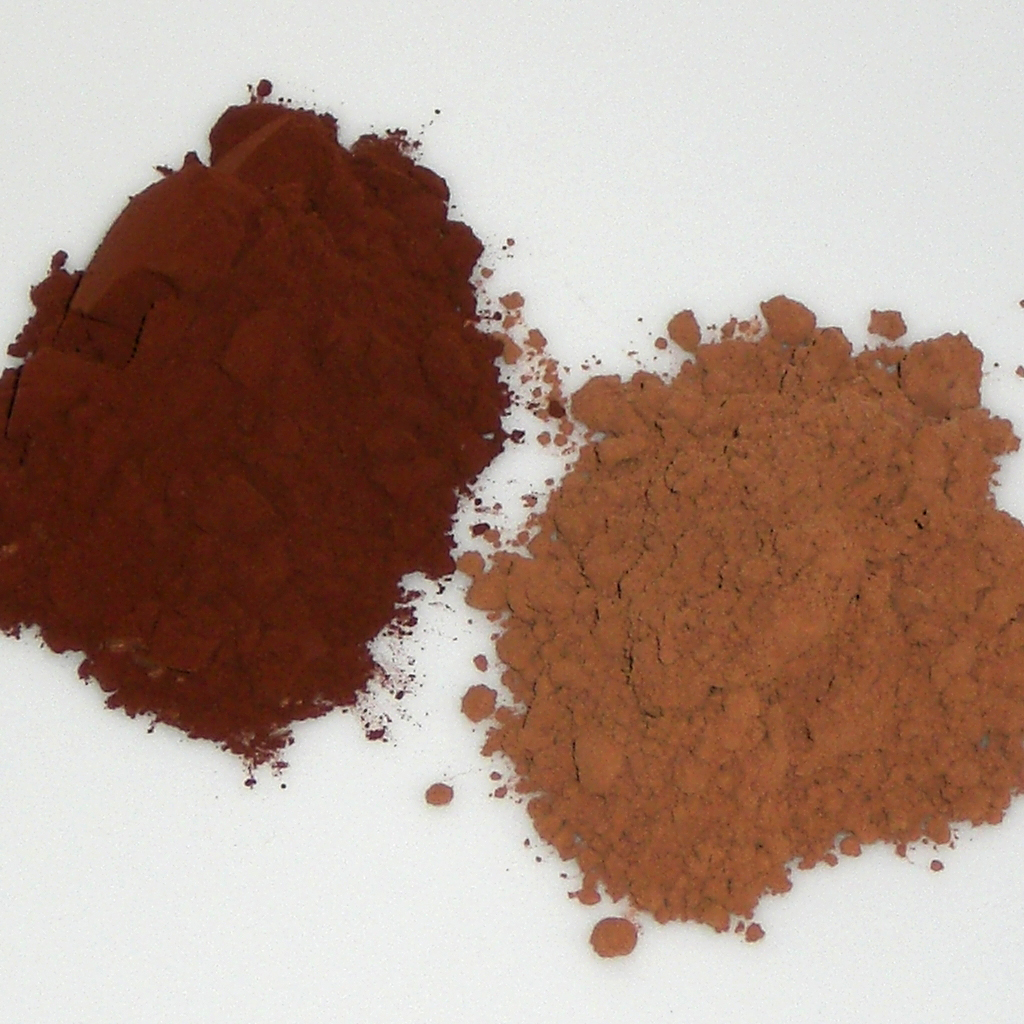
Cocoa powder, an example of a "hydrophobic substance".

The hydrophobic effect is the observed tendency of nonpolar substances to aggregate in an aqueous solution and to be excluded by water. The word hydrophobic literally means "water-fearing", and it describes the segregation of water and nonpolar substances, which maximizes the entropy of water and minimizes the area of contact between water and nonpolar molecules. In terms of thermodynamics, the hydrophobic effect is the free energy change of water surrounding a solute. A positive free energy change of the surrounding solvent indicates hydrophobicity, whereas a negative free energy change implies hydrophilicity.

The hydrophobic effect is responsible for the separation of a mixture of oil and water into its two components. It is also responsible for effects related to biology, including: cell membrane and vesicle formation, protein folding, insertion of membrane proteins into the nonpolar lipid environment and protein-small molecule associations. Hence the hydrophobic effect is essential to life. Substances for which this effect is observed are known as hydrophobes.

== Amphiphiles ==
Amphiphiles are molecules that have both hydrophobic and hydrophilic domains. Detergents are composed of amphiphiles that allow hydrophobic molecules to be solubilized in water by forming micelles and bilayers (as in soap bubbles). They are also important to cell membranes composed of amphiphilic phospholipids that prevent the internal aqueous environment of a cell from mixing with external water.

== Folding of macromolecules ==
In the case of protein folding, the hydrophobic effect is important to understanding the structure of proteins that have hydrophobic amino acids (such as valine, leucine, isoleucine, phenylalanine, tryptophan and methionine) clustered together within the protein. Structures of globular proteins have a hydrophobic core in which hydrophobic side chains are buried from water, which stabilizes the folded state. Charged and polar side chains are situated on the solvent-exposed surface where they interact with surrounding water molecules. Minimizing the number of hydrophobic side chains exposed to water is the principal driving force behind the folding process, although formation of hydrogen bonds within the protein also stabilizes protein structure.

The energetics of DNA tertiary-structure assembly were determined to be driven by the hydrophobic effect, in addition to Watson–Crick base pairing, which is responsible for sequence selectivity, and stacking interactions between the aromatic bases.

== Protein purification ==
In biochemistry, the hydrophobic effect can be used to separate mixtures of proteins based on their hydrophobicity. Column chromatography with a hydrophobic stationary phase such as phenyl-sepharose will cause more hydrophobic proteins to travel more slowly, while less hydrophobic ones elute from the column sooner. To achieve better separation, a salt may be added (higher concentrations of salt increase the hydrophobic effect) and its concentration decreased as the separation progresses.

== Cause ==
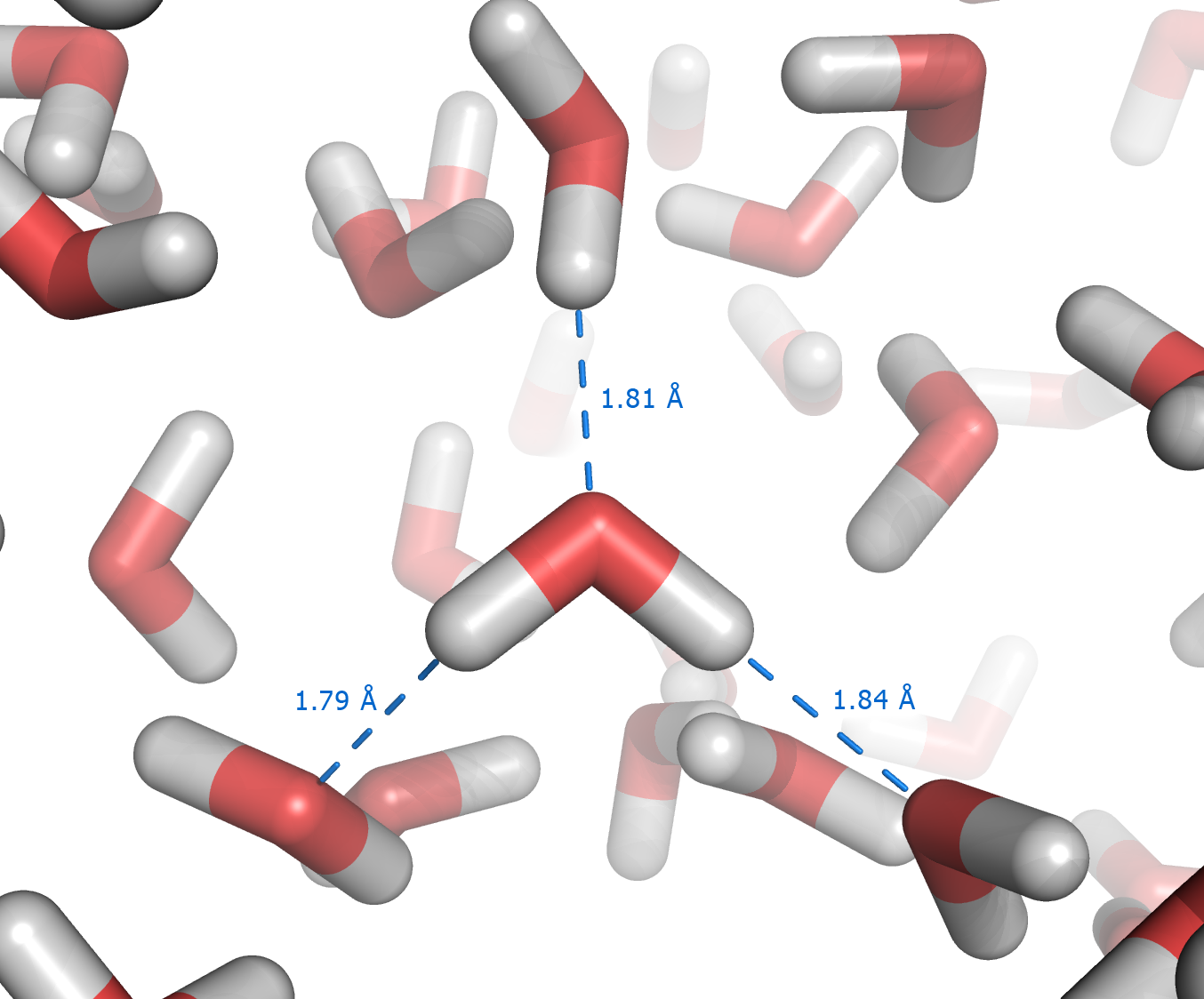
Dynamic hydrogen bonds between molecules of liquid water, the shape of the molecules is sometimes compared to that of boomerangs.

The origin of the hydrophobic effect is not fully understood. Some argue that the hydrophobic interaction is mostly an entropic effect originating from the disruption of highly dynamic hydrogen bonds between molecules of liquid water by the nonpolar solute. A hydrocarbon chain or a similar nonpolar region of a large molecule is incapable of forming hydrogen bonds with water. Introduction of such a non-hydrogen bonding surface into water causes disruption of the hydrogen bonding network between water molecules. The hydrogen bonds are reoriented tangentially to such surface to minimize disruption of the hydrogen bonded 3D network of water molecules, and this leads to a structured water "cage" around the nonpolar surface. The water molecules that form the "cage" (or clathrate) have restricted mobility. In the solvation shell of small nonpolar particles, the restriction amounts to some 10%. For example, in the case of dissolved xenon at room temperature a mobility restriction of 30% has been found. In the case of larger nonpolar molecules, the reorientational and translational motion of the water molecules in the solvation shell may be restricted by a factor of two to four; thus, at 25 °C the reorientational correlation time of water increases from 2 to 4-8 picoseconds. Generally, this leads to significant losses in translational and rotational entropy of water molecules and makes the process unfavorable in terms of the free energy in the system. By aggregating together, nonpolar molecules reduce the surface area exposed to water and minimize their disruptive effect.

The hydrophobic effect can be quantified by measuring the partition coefficients of non-polar molecules between water and non-polar solvents. The partition coefficients can be transformed to free energy of transfer which includes enthalpic and entropic components, ΔG = ΔH - TΔS. These components are experimentally determined by calorimetry. The hydrophobic effect was found to be entropy-driven at room temperature because of the reduced mobility of water molecules in the solvation shell of the non-polar solute; however, the enthalpic component of transfer energy was found to be favorable, meaning it strengthened water-water hydrogen bonds in the solvation shell due to the reduced mobility of water molecules. At the higher temperature, when water molecules become more mobile, this energy gain decreases along with the entropic component. The hydrophobic effect depends on the temperature, which leads to "cold denaturation" of proteins.

The hydrophobic effect can be calculated by comparing the free energy of solvation with bulk water. In this way, the hydrophobic effect not only can be localized but also decomposed into enthalpic and entropic contributions.

== See also ==
- Entropic force
- Hydrophobe
- Hydrophile
- Hydrophobicity scales
- Interfacial tension
- Superhydrophobe
- Superhydrophobic coating
