= Tablet (pharmacy) =

Drug delivery form in which the ingredients are solidified for later consumption

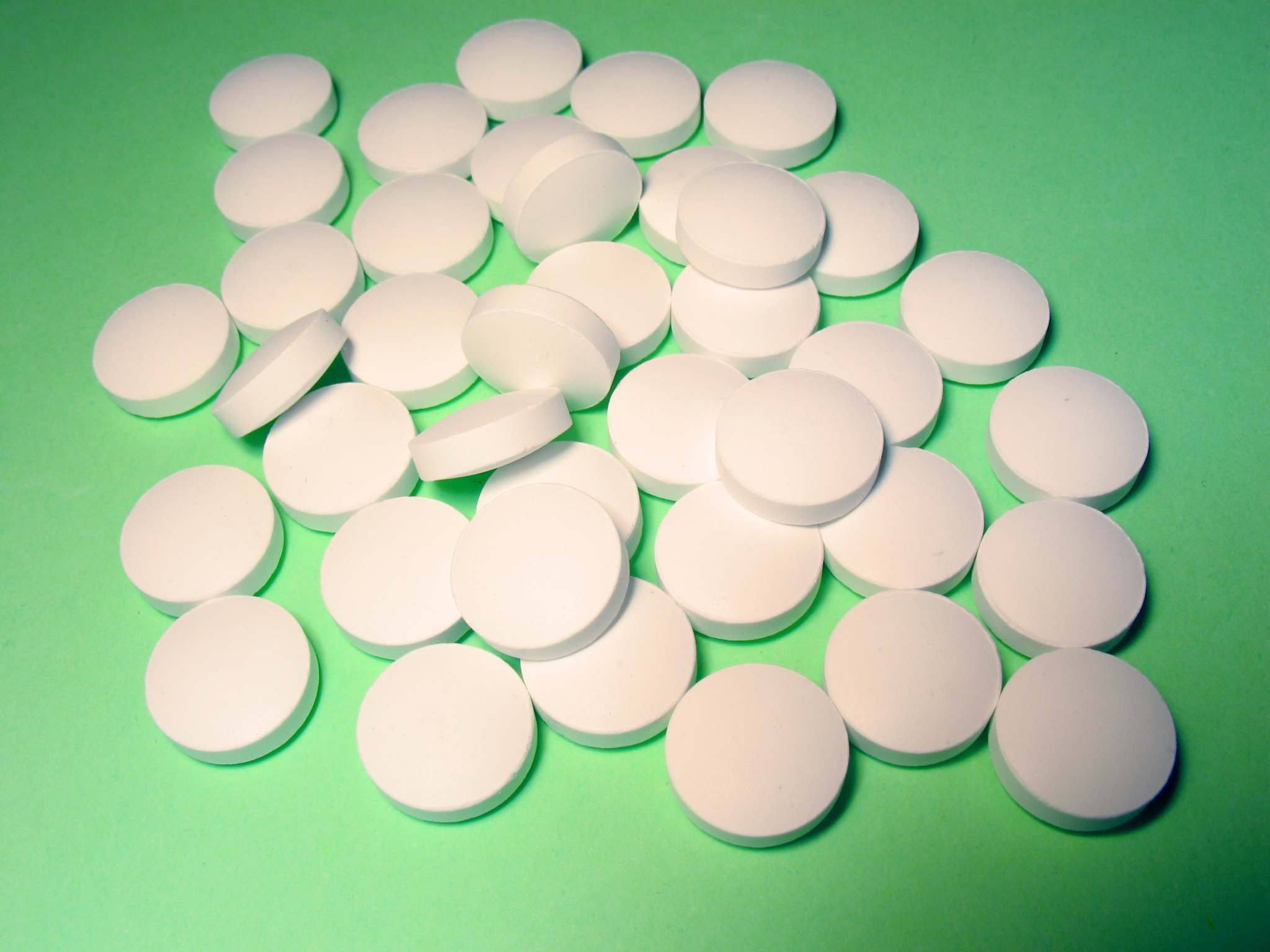
Common disk-shaped tablets

A tablet (also known as a pill) is a pharmaceutical oral dosage form (oral solid dosage, or OSD) or solid unit dosage form. Tablets may be defined as the solid unit dosage form of medication with suitable excipients. It comprises a mixture of active substances and excipients, usually in powder form, that are pressed or compacted into a solid dose. The main advantages of tablets are that they ensure a consistent dose of medicine that is easy to consume.

Tablets are prepared either by moulding or by compression. The excipients can include diluents, binders or granulating agents, glidants (flow aids) and lubricants to ensure efficient tabletting; disintegrants to promote tablet break-up in the digestive tract; sweeteners or flavours to enhance taste; and pigments to make the tablets visually attractive or aid in visual identification of an unknown tablet. A polymer coating is often applied to make the tablet smoother and easier to swallow, to control the release rate of the active ingredient, to make it more resistant to the environment (extending its shelf life), or to enhance the tablet's appearance.

Medicinal tablets were originally made in the shape of a disk of whatever colour their components determined, but are now made in many shapes and colours to help distinguish different medicines. Tablets are often imprinted with symbols, letters, and numbers, which allow them to be identified, or a groove to allow splitting by hand. Sizes of tablets to be swallowed range from a few millimetres to about a centimetre. Some people, especially younger children, can find swallowing tablets difficult. This is a skill that can be taught, even to relatively young children, in hospital and in community settings.

The compressed tablet is the most commonly seen dosage form in use today. About two-thirds of all prescriptions are dispensed as solid dosage forms, and half of these are compressed tablets. A tablet can be formulated to deliver an accurate dosage to a specific site in the body; it is usually taken orally, but can be administered sublingually, buccally, rectally or intravaginally. The tablet is just one of the many forms that an oral drug can take such as syrups, elixirs, suspensions, and emulsions.

== History ==
Pills are thought to date back to around 1500 BC. Earlier medical recipes, such as those from 4000 BC, were for liquid preparations rather than solids. The first references to pills were found on papyruses in ancient Egypt and contained bread dough, honey, or grease. Medicinal ingredients, such as plant powders or spices, were mixed in and formed by hand to make little balls, or pills. In ancient Greece, such medicines were known as katapotia ("something to be swallowed"), and the Roman scholar Pliny, who lived from 23 to 79 AD, first gave a name to what we now call pills, calling them pilula.

Pills have always been difficult to swallow, and efforts have been made to make them go down easier. In medieval times, people coated pills with slippery plant substances. Another approach, used as recently as the 19th century, was to gild them in gold and silver, although this often meant that they would pass through the digestive tract with no effect. In the 1800s, sugar coating and gelatin coating were invented, as were gelatin capsules.

In 1843, the British painter and inventor William Brockedon was granted a patent for a machine capable of "Shaping Pills, Lozenges, and Black Lead by Pressure in Dies". The device was capable of compressing powder into a tablet without the use of an adhesive.

== Types ==
=== Pills ===
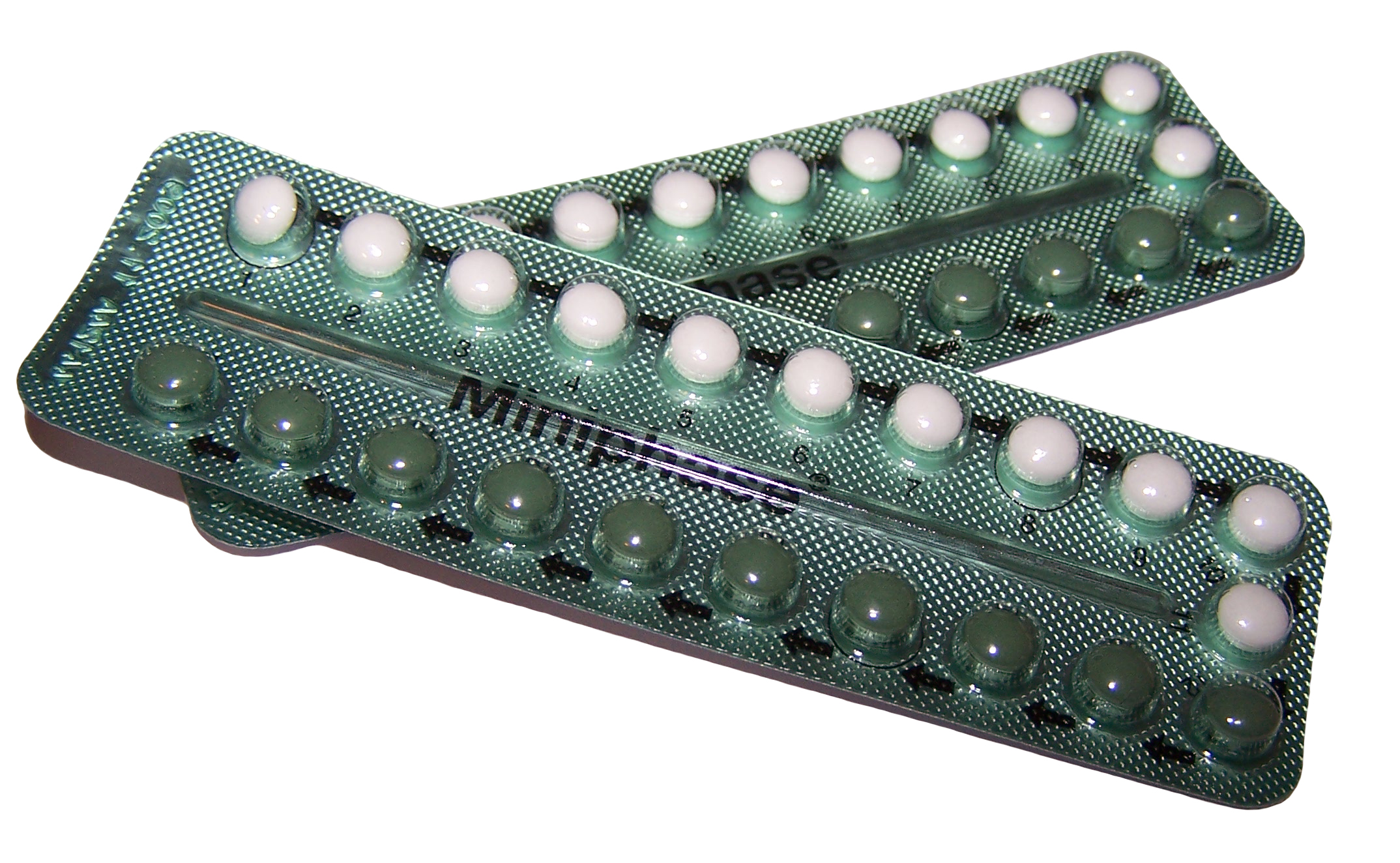
Combined oral contraceptive pills were nicknamed "the pill" in the 1960s

A pill was originally defined as a small, round, solid pharmaceutical oral dosage form of medication. The word's etymology reflects the historical concepts of grinding the ingredients with a mortar and pestle and rolling the resultant paste or dough into lumps to be dried. Today, in its strict sense, the word pill still refers specifically to tablets (including caplets) rather than capsules (which were invented much later), but because a simple hypernym is needed to intuitively cover all such oral dosage forms, the broad sense of the word pill is also widely used and includes both tablets and capsules — colloquially, any solid oral form of medication falls into the "pill" category (see pill § Usage notes).

An early example of a pill comes from ancient Rome. They were made of zinc carbonates, hydrozincite and smithsonite. The pills were used for sore eyes and were found aboard a Roman ship that wrecked in 140 BC. However, these tablets were meant to be pressed on the eyes, not swallowed.

Defects/imperfections arising during tablet manufacturing

- Formulation related: sticking, picking, binding
- Processing: capping, lamination, cracking, chipping
- Machine: double impression

=== Caplets ===
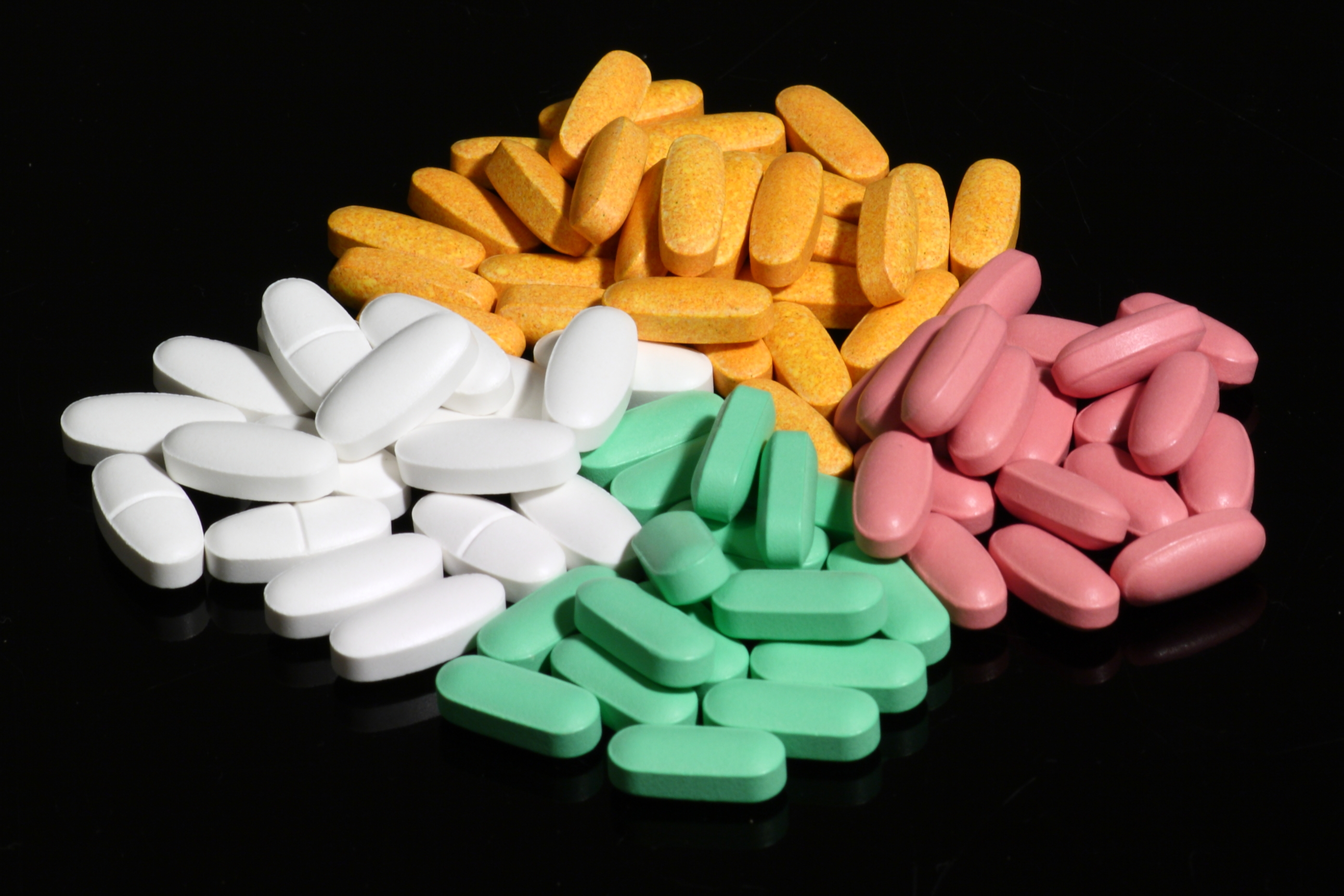
Variations on a common tablet design, which can be distinguished by both colour and shape

A caplet is a smooth, coated, oval-shaped medicinal tablet in the general shape of a capsule. Many caplets have an indentation running down the middle, so they may be split in half more easily. Consumers have viewed capsules as the most effective way to take medication ever since they first appeared. For this reason, producers of drugs such as OTC analgesics wanting to emphasize the strength of their product developed the "caplet", a portmanteau of capsule-shaped tablet, in order to tie this positive association to more efficiently produced tablet pills as well as being an easier-to-swallow shape than the usual disk-shaped tablet.

=== Orally disintegrating tablets (ODT) ===
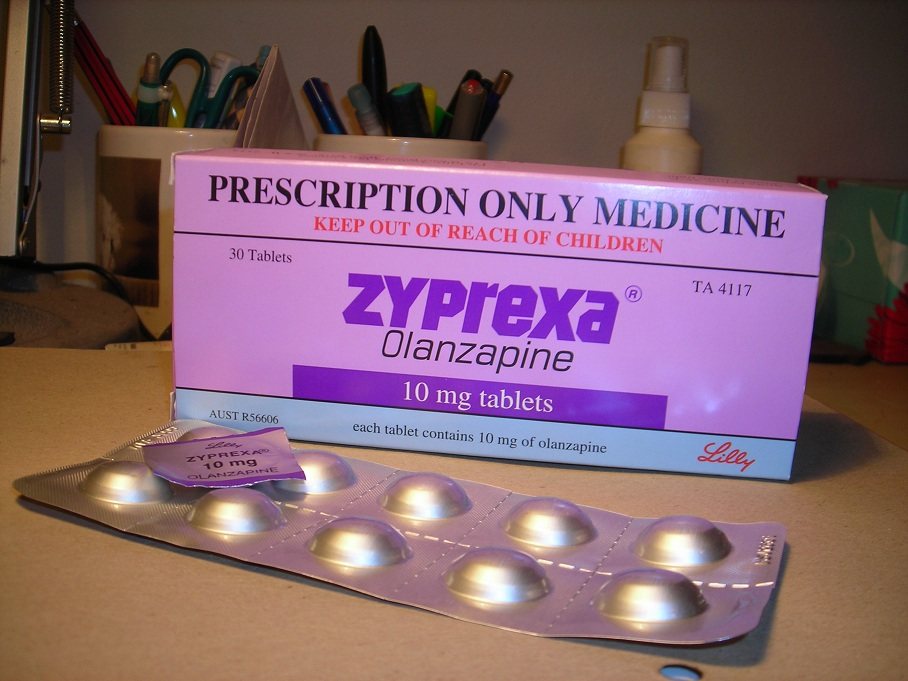
Olanzapine tablets

An orally disintegrating tablet or orodispersible tablet (ODT), is a drug dosage form available for a limited range of over-the-counter (OTC) and prescription medications. It, like the name suggests, disintegrates upon being consumed.

== Tablet formulations ==
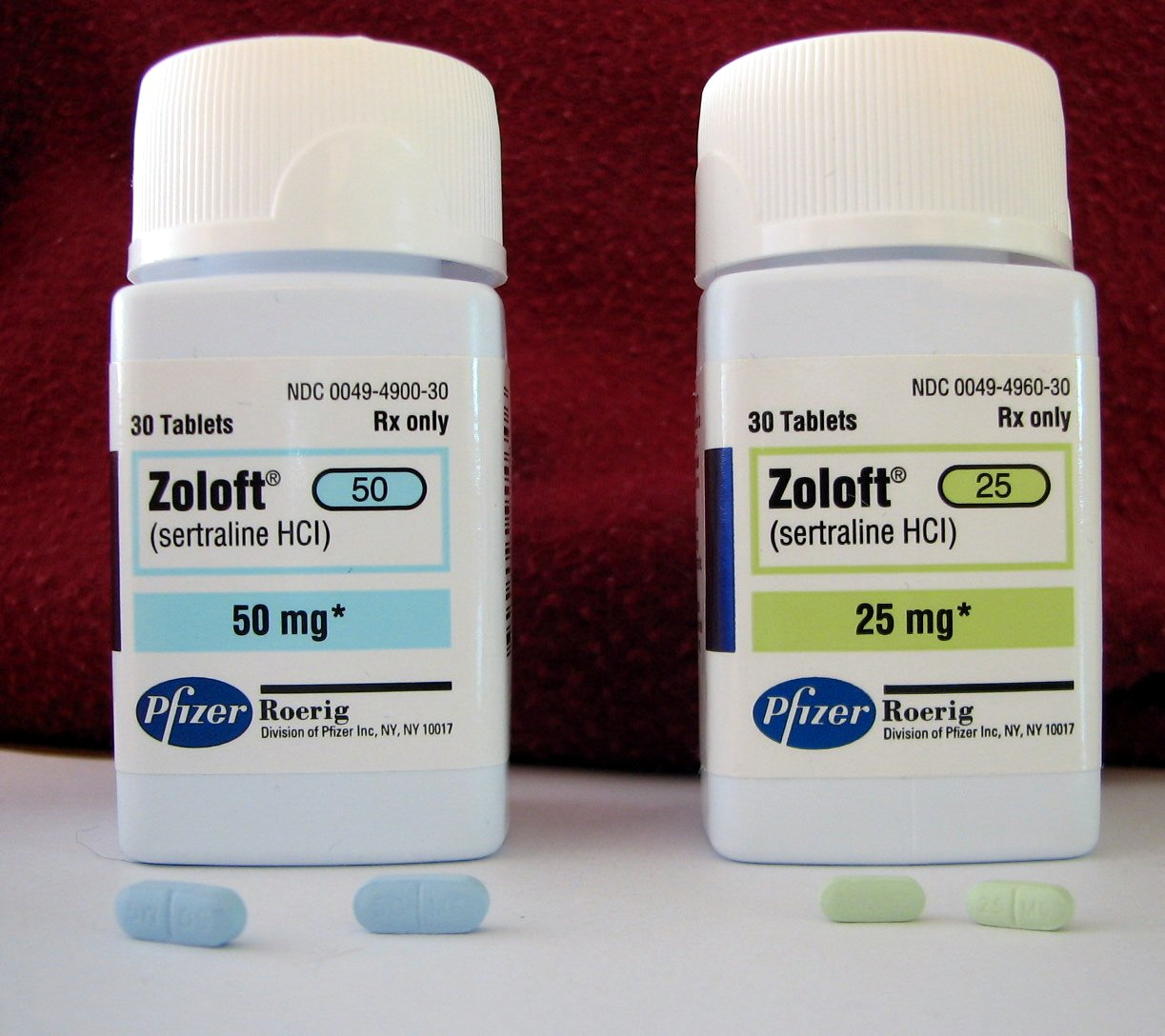
Bottles of sertraline tablets

In the tablet-pressing process, it is important that all ingredients be fairly dry, powdered or granular, somewhat uniform in particle size, and freely flowing. Mixed particle sized powders may separate during the manufacturing process due to differing particle densities. This can result in tablets with non-uniform concentrations of drug or active pharmaceutical ingredient (API), resulting in uneven dosage between tablets, but granulation should prevent this.

Some APIs may be compressed into tablets as pure substances, but this is rarely the case; most formulations include pharmacologically inactive ingredients (excipients):

- Usually a binder is added to help hold the tablet together and give it mechanical strength. A wide variety of binders may be used: some common ones are lactose, dibasic calcium phosphate, sucrose, corn (maize) starch, microcrystalline cellulose, povidone polyvinylpyrrolidone and modified cellulose (for example, hydroxypropyl methylcellulose and hydroxyethylcellulose).
- Often, an ingredient is also needed to act as a disintegrator to aid tablet dispersion once swallowed, releasing the API for absorption. Some binders, such as starch and cellulose, are also excellent disintegrators.

== Tablet properties ==
Tablets can be made in virtually any shape, although the requirements of patients and tableting machines mean that most are round, oval, or capsule-shaped. More unusual shapes have been manufactured, but patients find these harder to swallow, and they are more vulnerable to chipping or manufacturing problems.

Tablet diameter and shape are determined by the machine tooling used to produce them; a die plus an upper and a lower punch are required. This is called a station of tooling. The amount of tablet material and the placement of the punches in relation to one another during compression determine the thickness. Once this is done, we can measure the corresponding pressure applied during compression. The shorter the distance between the punches, the greater the pressure applied during compression, and sometimes the harder the tablet. Tablets need to be hard enough that they do not break up in the bottle, yet friable enough that they disintegrate in the gastric tract.

Tablets need to be strong enough to resist the stresses of packaging, shipping, and handling by the pharmacist and patient. The mechanical strength of tablets is assessed using a combination of simple failure and erosion tests, and more sophisticated engineering tests. The simpler tests are often used for quality control purposes, whereas the more complex tests are used during the design of the formulation and manufacturing process in the research and development phase. Standards for tablet properties are published in the various international pharmacopeias (USP/NF, EP, JP, etc.). The hardness of tablets is the principal measure of mechanical strength. Hardness is tested using a tablet hardness tester. The units for hardness have evolved since the 1930s but are commonly measured in kilograms per square centimetre. Models of testers include the Monsanto (or Stokes) Hardness Tester from 1930, the Pfizer Hardness Tester from 1950, the Strong Cob Hardness Tester and the Heberlain (or Schleeniger) Hardness Tester.

Lubricants prevent ingredients from clumping together and from sticking to the tablet punches or capsule filling machine. Lubricants also ensure that tablet formation and ejection can occur with low friction between the solid and die wall, as well as between granules, which helps in uniform filling of the die.

Common minerals like talc or silica, and fats, e.g. vegetable stearin, magnesium stearate or stearic acid are the most frequently used lubricants in tablets or hard gelatin capsules.

== Manufacturing ==
=== Manufacture of the tableting blend ===
In the tablet pressing process, the appropriate amount of active ingredient must be in each tablet. Hence, all the ingredients should be well mixed. If a sufficiently homogenous mix of the components cannot be obtained with simple blending processes, the ingredients must be granulated prior to compression to assure an even distribution of the active compound in the final tablet. Two basic techniques are used to granulate powders for compression into tablets: wet granulation and dry granulation. Powders that can be mixed well do not require granulation and can be compressed into tablets through direct compression ("DC"). Direct compression is desirable as it is quicker. There is less processing, equipment, labor, and energy consumption. However, DC is difficult when a formulation has a high content of poorly compressible active ingredients.

=== Wet granulation ===
Wet granulation is a process of using a liquid binder to lightly agglomerate the powder mixture. The amount of liquid has to be properly controlled, as over-wetting will cause the granules to be too hard and under-wetting will cause them to be too soft and friable. Aqueous solutions have the advantage of being safer to deal with than solvent-based systems but may not be suitable for drugs which are degraded by hydrolysis.

Procedure

1. The active ingredient and excipients are weighed and mixed.
2. The wet granulate is prepared by adding the liquid binder–adhesive to the powder blend and mixing thoroughly. Examples of binders/adhesives include aqueous preparations of cornstarch, natural gums such as acacia, cellulose derivatives such as methyl cellulose, gelatin, and povidone.
3. Screening the damp mass through a mesh to form pellets or granules.
4. Drying the granulation. A conventional tray-dryer or fluid-bed dryer are most commonly used.
5. After the granules are dried, they are passed through a screen of smaller size than the one used for the wet mass to create granules of uniform size.

Low shear wet granulation processes use very simple mixing equipment, and can take a considerable time to achieve a uniformly mixed state. High shear wet granulation processes use equipment that mixes the powder and liquid at a very fast rate, and thus speeds up the manufacturing process. Fluid bed granulation is a multiple-step wet granulation process performed in the same vessel to pre-heat, granulate, and dry the powders. It is used because it allows close control of the granulation process.

=== Dry granulation ===
Dry granulation processes create granules by light compaction of the powder blend under low pressures. The compacts so-formed are broken up gently to produce granules (agglomerates). This process is often used when the product to be granulated is sensitive to moisture and heat. Dry granulation can be conducted on a tablet press using slugging tooling or on a roll press called a roller compactor. Dry granulation equipment offers a wide range of pressures to attain proper densification and granule formation. Dry granulation is simpler than wet granulation, therefore the cost is reduced. However, dry granulation often produces a higher percentage of fine granules, which can compromise the quality or create yield problems for the tablet. Dry granulation requires drugs or excipients with cohesive properties, and a 'dry binder' may need to be added to the formulation to facilitate the formation of granules.

=== Hot melt extrusion ===
Hot melt extrusion is utilized in pharmaceutical solid oral dose processing to enable delivery of drugs with poor solubility and bioavailability. Hot melt extrusion has been shown to molecularly disperse poorly soluble drugs in a polymer carrier increasing dissolution rates and bioavailability. The process involves the application of heat, pressure and agitation to mix materials together and 'extrude' them through a die. Twin-screw high shear extruders blend materials and simultaneously break up particles. The extruded particles can then be blended and compressed into tablets or filled into capsules.

=== Granule lubrication ===
After granulation, a final lubrication step is used to ensure that the tableting blend does not stick to the equipment during the tableting process. This usually involves low shear blending of the granules with a powdered lubricant, such as magnesium stearate or stearic acid.

=== Manufacture of the tablets ===
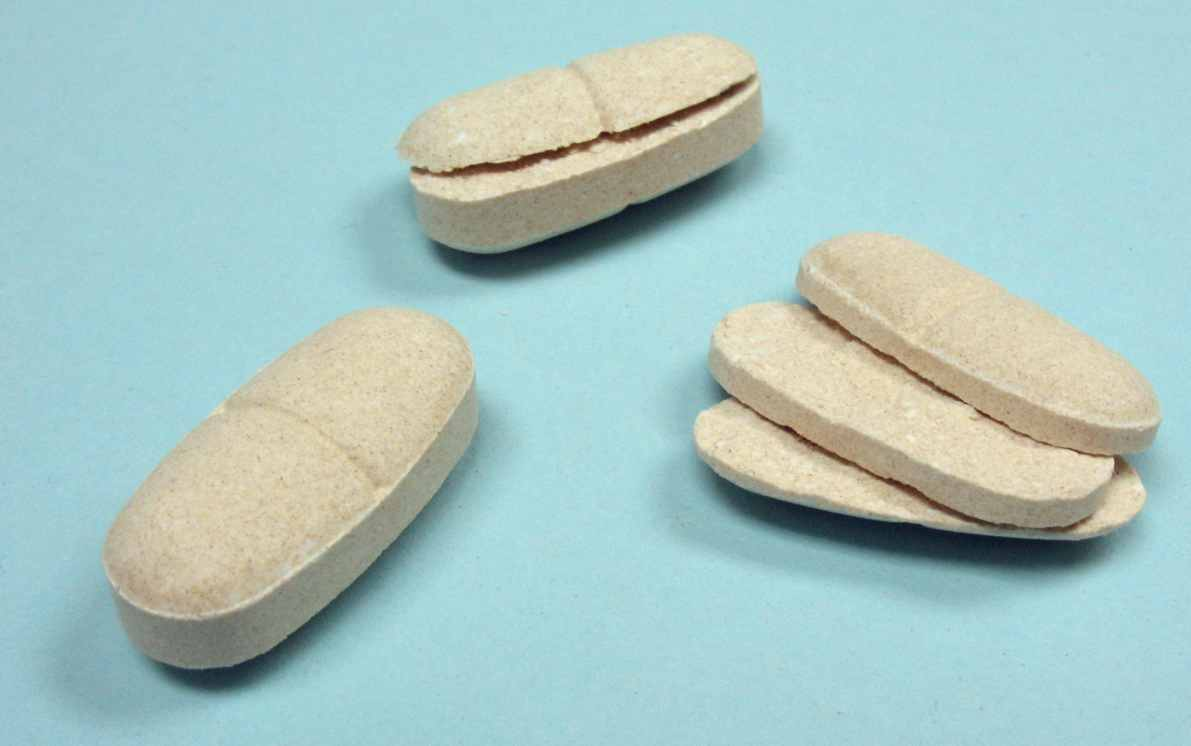
Tablets that failed due to capping and lamination compared to a normal tablet

Whatever process is used to make the tableting blend, the process of making a tablet by powder compaction is very similar. First, the powder is filled into the die from above. The mass of powder is determined by the position of the lower punch in the die, the cross-sectional area of the die, and the powder density. At this stage, adjustments to the tablet weight are normally made by repositioning the lower punch. After die filling, the upper punch is lowered into the die and the powder is uniaxially compressed to a porosity of between 5 and 20%. The compression can take place in one or two stages (main compression, and, sometimes, pre-compression or tamping) and for commercial production occurs very fast (500–50 ms per tablet). Finally, the upper punch is pulled up and out of the die (decompression), and the tablet is ejected from the die by lifting the lower punch until its upper surface is flush with the top face of the die. This process is repeated for each tablet.

Common problems encountered during tablet manufacturing operations include:

- Fluctuations in tablet weight, usually caused by uneven powder flow into the die due to poor powder flow properties.
- Fluctuations in dosage of the Active Pharmaceutical Ingredient, caused by uneven distribution of the API in the tableting blend (either due to poor mixing or separation in process).
- Sticking of the powder blend to the tablet tooling, due to inadequate lubrication, worn or dirty tooling, or a sticky powder formulation
- Capping, lamination or chipping. This is caused by air being compressed with the tablet formulation and then expanding when the punch is released: if this breaks the tablet apart, it can be due to incorrect machine settings, or due to incorrect formulation: either because the tablet formulation is too brittle or not adhesive enough, or because the powder being fed to the tablet press contains too much air (has too low bulk density).
- Capping can also occur due to high moisture content.

Consequently, permanent consistency checks are required during the manufacturing process.

=== Tablet compaction simulator ===
Tablet formulations are designed and tested using a laboratory machine called a Tablet Compaction Simulator or Powder Compaction Simulator. This is a computer controlled device that can measure the punch positions, punch pressures, friction forces, die wall pressures, and sometimes the tablet internal temperature during the compaction event. Numerous experiments with small quantities of different mixtures can be performed to optimise a formulation. Mathematically corrected punch motions can be programmed to simulate any type and model of production tablet press. Initial quantities of active pharmaceutical ingredients are very expensive to produce, and using a Compaction Simulator reduces the amount of powder required for product development.

=== Tablet presses ===
The tablet pressing operation

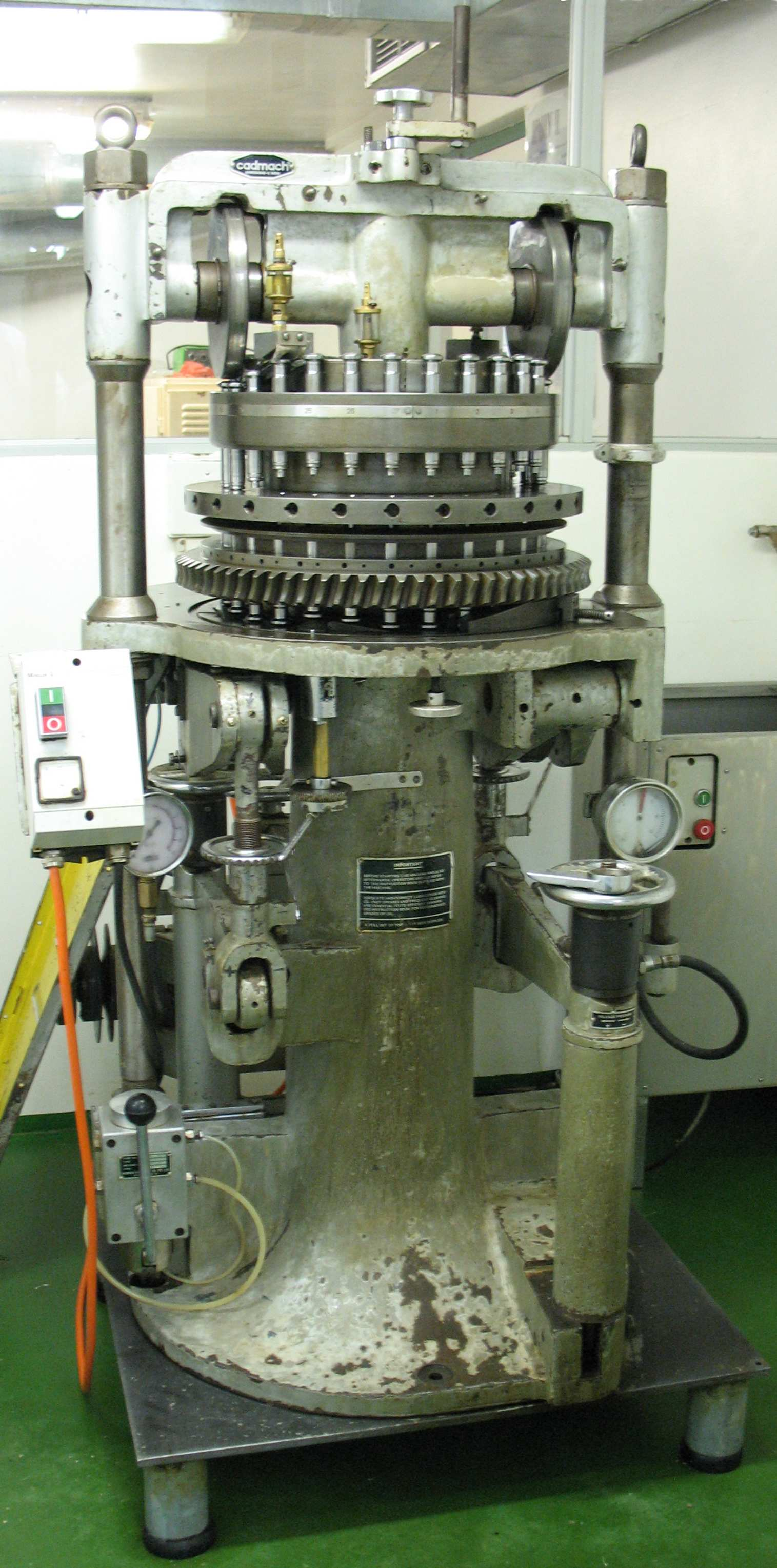
An old Cadmach rotary tablet press

Tablet presses, also called tableting machines, range from small, inexpensive bench-top models that make one tablet at a time (single-station presses), with only around a half-ton pressure, to large, computerized, industrial models (multi-station rotary presses) that can make hundreds of thousands to millions of tablets an hour with much greater pressure. The tablet press is an essential piece of machinery for any pharmaceutical and nutraceutical manufacturer. Tablet presses must allow the operator to adjust the position of the lower and upper punches accurately, so that the tablet weight, thickness and density/hardness can each be controlled. This is achieved using a series of cams, rollers, or tracks that act on the tablet tooling (punches). Mechanical systems are also incorporated for die filling, and for ejecting and removing the tablets from the press after compression. Pharmaceutical tablet presses are required to be easy to clean and quick to reconfigure with different tooling, because they are usually used to manufacture many different products. There are two main standards of tablet tooling used in pharmaceutical industry: American standard TSM and European standard EU. TSM and EU configurations are similar to each other but cannot be interchanged.

Modern tablet presses reach output volumes of up to 1,700,000 tablets per hour. These huge volumes require frequent in-process quality control for the tablet weight, thickness and hardness. Due to efforts to reduce rejects rates and machine down-time, automated tablet testing devices are used on-line with the tablet press or off-line in the IPC-labs.

=== Tablet coating ===
Many tablets today are coated after being pressed. Although sugar-coating was popular in the past, the process has many drawbacks. Modern tablet coatings are polymer and polysaccharide based, with plasticizers and pigments included. Tablet coatings must be stable and strong enough to survive the handling of the tablet, must not make tablets stick together during the coating process, and must follow the fine contours of embossed characters or logos on tablets. Coatings are necessary for tablets that have an unpleasant taste, and a smoother finish makes large tablets easier to swallow. Tablet coatings are also useful to extend the shelf-life of components that are sensitive to moisture or oxidation. Special coatings (for example with pearlescent effects) can enhance brand recognition.

If the active ingredient of a tablet is sensitive to acid, or is irritant to the stomach lining, an enteric coating can be used, which is resistant to stomach acid, and dissolves in the less acidic area of the intestines. Enteric coatings are also used for medicines that can be negatively affected by taking a long time to reach the small intestine, where they are absorbed. Coatings are often chosen to control the rate of dissolution of the drug in the gastrointestinal tract. Some drugs are absorbed better in certain parts of the digestive system. If this part is the stomach, a coating is selected that dissolves quickly and easily in acid. If the rate of absorption is best in the large intestine or colon, a coating is used that is acid resistant and dissolves slowly to ensure that the tablet reaches that point before dispersing. To measure the disintegration time of the tablet coating and the tablet core, automatic disintegration testers are used which are able to determine the complete disintegration process of a tablet by measuring the rest height of the thickness with every upward stroke of the disintegration tester basket.

There are two types of coating machines used in the pharmaceutical industry: coating pans and automatic coaters. Coating pans are used mostly to sugar coat pellets. Automatic coaters are used for all kinds of coatings; they can be equipped with a remote control panel, a dehumidifier, and dust collectors. An explosion-proof design is required for applying coatings that contain alcohol.

=== Pill-splitters ===
It is sometimes necessary to split tablets into halves or quarters. Tablets are easier to break accurately if scored, but there are devices called pill-splitters which cut unscored and scored tablets. Tablets with special coatings (for example, enteric coatings or controlled-release coatings) should not be broken before use, as this exposes the tablet core to the digestive juices, circumventing the intended delayed-release effect.

== See also ==
- 3D drug printing
- Reagent testing
