= Tablet hardness testing =

Tablet hardness testing is a laboratory technique used by the pharmaceutical industry to determine the breaking point and structural integrity of a tablet and find out how it changes "under conditions of storage, transportation, packaging and handling before usage" The breaking point of a tablet is based on its shape. It is similar to friability testing, but they are not the same thing.

Tablet hardness testers first appeared in the 1930s. In the 1950s, the Strong-Cobb tester was introduced. It was patented by Robert Albrecht on July 21, 1953. and used an air pump. The tablet breaking force was based on arbitrary units referred to as Strong-Cobbs. The new one gave readings that were inconsistent to those given by the older testers. Later, electro-mechanical testing machines were introduced. They often include mechanisms like motor drives, and the ability to send measurements to a computer or printer.

There are 2 main processes to test tablet hardness: compression testing and 3 point bend testing. For compression testing, the analyst generally aligns the tablet in a repeatable way, and the tablet is squeezed between a fixed and a moving jaw. The first machines continually applied force with a spring and screw thread until the tablet started to break. When the tablet fractured, the hardness was read with a sliding scale.

== List of common hardness testers ==
There are several devices used to perform this task:

- The Monsanto tester was developed 50 years ago. The design consists of "a barrel containing a compressible spring held between 2 plungers". The tablet is placed on the lower plunger, and the upper plunger is lowered onto it.
- The Strong-Cobb tester forces an anvil against a stationary platform. Results are viewed from a hydraulic gauge. The results are very similar to that of the Monsanto tester.
- The Pfizer tester compresses tablet between a holding anvil and a piston connected to a force-reading gauge when its plier-like handles are gripped.
- The Erweka tester tests a tablet placed on the lower anvil and a weight moving along a rail transmits pressure slowly to the tablet.
- The Dr.Schleuniger Pharmatron tester operates in a horizontal position. An electric motor drives an anvil to compress a tablet at a constant rate. The tablet is pushed against a stationary anvil until it fractures. A reading is taken from a scale indicator.
- Kraemer Elektronik's tablet testing system was the first automatic tablet hardness testing system for auto-regulation at tablet presses, invented by German mechanical engineer Mr. Norbert Kraemer in Darmstadt, Germany. The tablets are separated by a patented feeder chute and moved on a horizontal starwheel through different testing stations. The Kraemer Elektronik automatic tablet testing system measures weight, thickness, diameter/length, width and hardness of tablets and capsules.

== Units of measurement ==
According to the International System of Units, the units of measurement of tablet hardness mostly follow standards used in materials testing.

- Kilogram (kg) – The kilogram is recognized by the SI system as the primary unit of mass.
- Newton (N) – The Newton is the SI unit of force; the standard for tablet hardness testing. 9.807 Newtons = 1 kilogram (at one G, earth surface gravity).
- Pound (lb) – Technically a unit of force but can also be used for mass under earth gravity. Sometimes used for tablet strength testing in North America, but it is not an SI unit. 1 kilogram = 2.204 pounds.
- Kilopond (kp) – Not to be confused with a pound. A unit of force also called a kilogram of force. Still used today in some applications, but not recognized by the SI system. 1 kilopond = 1 kgf.
- Strong-Cobb (SC) – An ad hoc unit of force which is a legacy of one of the first tablet hardness testing machines. Although the SC is arbitrary, it was recognized as the international standard from the 1950s to the 1980s. 1 Strong-Cobb represented roughly 0.7 kilogram of force or about 7 newtons. Although the Strong-Cobb unit is arbitrarily based on the dial reading of the Strong Cobb hardness tester, it became an international standard for tablet hardness in the 1950s until it was superseded by testers using SI units in the 1980s. The Strong-Cobb is a unit with a very unusual name for a unit of measurement since it is named after the company, Strong-Cobb Inc. The inventor of the hardness tester was Robert Albrecht, the plant engineer for the Strong-Cobb Company. He sold the patent to the company for $1.00.
