= Hydrophobic concrete =

Concrete that repels water

Hydrophobic concrete is concrete that repels water. It meets the standards outlined in the definition of waterproof concrete. Developed in Australia in the mid-20th century, millions of cubic yards of hydrophobic concrete have been laid in Australia, Asia, and Europe, and in the United States since 1999. Its effective use in hundreds of structures has contributed to its large acceptance and growing use.

== Structure ==
Typical concrete is quite hydrophilic. This comes from its intricate system of tiny capillaries, which suck water through the microcrack network within a concrete slab. This hardened matrix creates a continuous "source to sink" cycle, meaning water from above is constantly pulled to an area of lower elevation. Darcy's coefficient refers to the ability of liquefied water under pressure to flow through any pores and capillaries that are present. A lower Darcy's constant correlates with a higher quality material.

Commercial companies use different approaches to modify a regular concrete mixture in order to create hydrophobic concrete, all of which involve somehow filling the porous concrete mixture. Some of the most commonly used methods include polymer formation, small speck infusion, and crystalline formations, the latter being the most widely used.

Polymer formation works by having a water-soluble pre-polymer polymerize via ion exchange with di-valent metal ions such as Ca and Fe ions to form rubbery insoluble particles. These small particles migrate and concentrate in the small fissures and capillaries formed in the concrete as it dries. As polymerization proceeds, rubber plugs form and permanently seal these water pathways, greatly reducing both water absorption and water permeability.

Crystalline technology is used to create hydrophobic concrete by causing crystal structures to form in the tiny capillaries, pores and other air pockets left behind in the concrete curing process. During this formation, by-products are left behind in the capillaries and pores of the freshly cured concrete, typically calcium hydroxide, sulfates, sodium carbonates, potassium, calcium, and hydrated and unhydrated cement particles. These crystal structures then plug the pores and capillaries, preventing water from flowing through them. Once the crystalline chemicals are added to the concrete mixture, through either an admixture or coating, they react with the by-products in the presence of water. This reaction then forms an insoluble crystal structure that clogs the pores. This process continues until all the chemicals have reacted. When applied as a coating, the chemical reaction proceeds through the process of chemical diffusion. This is a process of a high chemical density solution migrating towards the low density chemical solution until the two come into equilibrium. Soaking the concrete in water creates a low chemical density in the pores, and applying the crystalline chemical as a coating then creates a high chemical density. These two fluids diffuse through the inner structure of the concrete until they reach equilibrium throughout the inner structure. When this process is finished, the hydrophobic concrete's crystal structure is complete.

== Properties ==
The ultimate goal when forming a hydrophobic material is to reduce the polarity of the molecules. Because water molecules are very polar, they are easily attract to partially positive or partially negative charges. On a neutral surface, water molecules bunch up and attract each other, creating a spherical droplet of water. These droplets can then evaporate off the concrete surface rather than be absorbed into the capillaries of the concrete. The exact structure and composition of the crystals used in hydrophobic concrete is not public information; due to its properties, however, it can be assumed that it is a non-polar molecule.

The property to repel water gives hydrophobic concrete the ability to avoid contamination by particles dissolved in water drops. Because the crystals themselves are not polar, there is little interaction between the crystals and dissolved oxygen. This allows the concrete to withstand the rebar rusting that so often compromises the strength of concrete that has iron bars running through it. Standard commercial concrete has an average water absorption of 4-10%. In contrast, hydrophobic concrete has an average of 0.3-1%.

An overlooked property of hydrophobic concrete is its ability to repel humidity in the air as well. In contrast to liquid water, water molecules in the air moving with a higher kinetic energy and ultimately exist in a gas-like form. The crystal structures in hydrophobic concrete are compact enough to prevent humidity from moving through the capillaries of the concrete.

== Processing ==
Hydrophobic concrete is produced in a variety of ways that fall under two categories; coatings or admixtures. Both allow the crystal structures to form in the presence of water.

When creating hydrophobic concrete through a coating process, a coating is sprayed or brushed onto a porous surfaces. In most cases, it is applied to a regular concrete slab that then undergoes a corrosive process to expose more of the concrete's capillaries. This can be achieved by water blasting the surface at about 3,000-4,000 psi. Sandblasting and acid etching are also suitable processes. The addition of water is the next step. It can be applied either vertically or horizontally, but temperatures should not go below 33 degrees Fahrenheit to prevent freezing. Excessive evaporation should also be avoided. In areas with high evaporation rates, this process often takes place overnight when temperatures are cooler. Once the pores are saturated as much as possible with water, the coating is applied. Hydrophobic chemicals are in a powder form and mixed with water at a ratio of five parts powder to two parts water for application by brush. For spray application, the ratio is five parts powder to three parts water. The coating is applied between 1.25-1.5 lb per square yard and continues until the whole surface is covered. If the surface requires another coat, it must be applied within forty eight hours of the initial application of the hydrophobic mixture. Once applied, the concrete must cure in a moist environment two to three hours after the application. This is achieved by spraying the surface with water at least three times a day for a few days. Evaporation retardants are also occasionally used. Depending on the climate, the curing process may take longer and require more frequent wetting. Once the concrete is cured, it sits for two to three weeks before the process is complete.

When hydrophobic concrete is made through the use of an admixture, a powder with the hydrophobic chemicals is added during the batching process. In other words, it is added to the concrete mixture itself when the concrete is laid. The usual dosage is two to three percent of the concrete mixture. Because water is a part of the batching process, an additional curing process is not required. This approach is easier and less labor-intensive, but it can only be used when new concrete is laid.

== Uses ==
Hydrophobic concrete can be used in the same applications as regular concrete, most often where regular concrete is dangerous to repair or the cost of structural damage would be highly detrimental. Tunnel work is a major application of hydrophobic concrete as underground repairs are difficult and costly. It is also a favorite choice for laying foundations for buildings and sidewalks in locations below the water table.

Underwater use of hydrophobic concrete is a major application in marine facilities. Is often used to hold water to create pools and ponds. NASA used hydrophobic concrete to build the swimming pool used to train astronauts for walking on the Moon. Hydrophobic concrete is also used in applications that are exposed to rain or rain puddling, such as green roofs, other kinds of roofs, parking structures, and plazas.

== Advantages ==
Amongst the many benefits of using hydrophobic concrete, it reduces installation time and lowers costs. Use of hydrophobic concrete can reduce the labor time of industrial project because normal concrete involves a corrosion proofing period as well as a waterproofing period. With hydrophobic concrete, both corrosion proofing and waterproofing are done at the same time.

Likewise, time reduction reduces installation costs. Regular, membrane-backed concrete can cost around US$5 per square foot, although prices can vary based on the application. The one-step installation process of hydrophobic concrete brings the cost down to about US$3.20 per square foot. Such savings can quickly add up over the course of a project, as reported by the Hycrete company of southern California.

An estimated five billion dollars were spent in Western Europe alone on hydrophilic cement repairs in 1998. Most of the repairs were necessary due to the damage of water corrosion in urban areas. Because there is little or no water corrosion, hydrophobic concrete is better preserved than regular concrete, which typically looks worn and aged after a few years.

From an environmental standpoint, hydrophobic concrete is also beneficial because it is "green". Its ability to be re-crushed makes it easily reusable. Although regular concrete can be re-crushed, it involves a very costly process, which often means that the concrete ends up in a landfill. This advantage of hydrophobic concrete enables its cost-efficient reuse in future projects.

== Disadvantages ==
Some other cons to hydrophobic concrete come from the application process. When applied as a coating, it can only penetrate up to 12 inches into the material. Also, the coating process itself is extremely labor-intensive. If the structure is thicker than 12 inches, or it is a large-area project, an admixture approach would have better results.

Using the alternative crystalline technology to produce hydrophobic concrete is only possible when water is present, since the surface must be carefully wetted before the coating is applied.
