= Dissolution testing =

Form of drug testing

In the pharmaceutical industry, drug dissolution testing is routinely used to provide critical in vitro drug release information for both quality control purposes, i.e., to assess batch-to-batch consistency of solid oral dosage forms such as tablets, and drug development, i.e., to predict in vivo drug release profiles. There are three typical situations where dissolution testing plays a vital role: (i) formulation and optimization decisions: during product development, for products where dissolution performance is a critical quality attribute, both the product formulation and the manufacturing process are optimized based on achieving specific dissolution targets. (ii) Equivalence decisions: during generic product development, and also when implementing post-approval process or formulation changes, similarity of in vitro dissolution profiles between the reference product and its generic or modified version are one of the key requirements for regulatory approval decisions. (iii) Product compliance and release decisions: during routine manufacturing, dissolution outcomes are very often one of the criteria used to make product release decisions.

The main objective of developing and evaluating an IVIVC is to establish the dissolution test as a surrogate for human studies, as stated by the Food and Drug Administration (FDA). Analytical data from drug dissolution testing are sufficient in many cases to establish safety and efficacy of a drug product without in vivo tests, following minor formulation and manufacturing changes (Qureshi and Shabnam, 2001). Thus, the dissolution testing which is conducted in dissolution apparatus must be able to provide accurate and reproducible results.

== Equipment ==
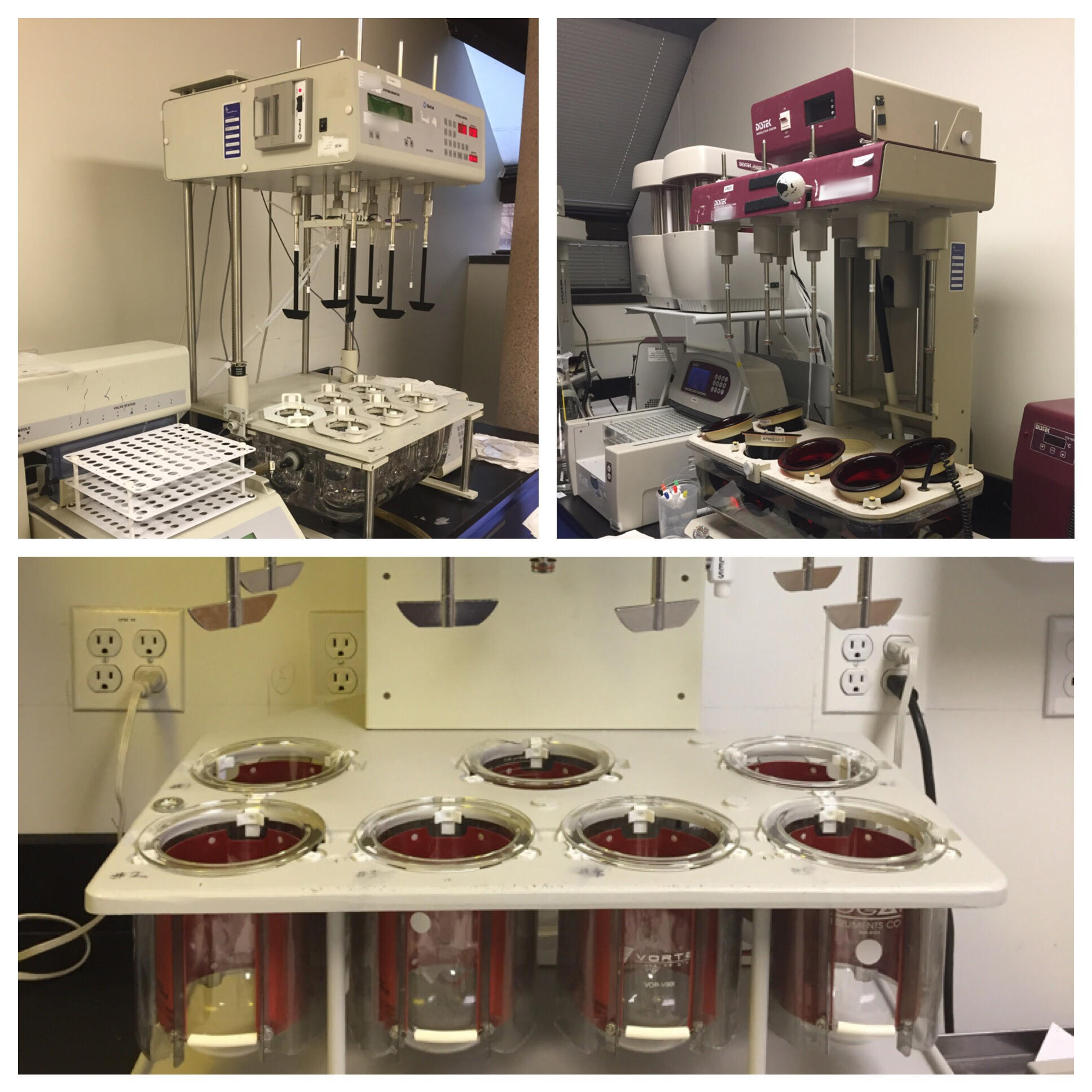
Different types of Dissolution Units: A Water-bath unit equipped with USP Dissolution Apparatus 2 - Paddle (Top-left), A amber vessel water bath unit that has been equipped with USP Dissolution Apparatus 1 without baskets being placed on yet (Top-right), and a dissolution unit that uses a heating jacket (bottom)

Several dissolution apparatuses exist. In United States Pharmacopeia (USP) General Chapter <711> Dissolution, there are four dissolution apparatuses standardized and specified. They are:

- USP Dissolution Apparatus 1 – Basket (37 °C ± 0.5 °C )
- USP Dissolution Apparatus 2 – Paddle (37 °C ± 0.5 °C)
- USP Dissolution Apparatus 3 – Reciprocating Cylinder (37 °C ± 0.5 °C)
- USP Dissolution Apparatus 4 – Flow-Through Cell (37 °C ± 0.5 °C)
- USP Dissolution Apparatus 5 - Reciprocating Disk (37 °C ± 0.5 °C)

=== General Method ===
The vessels of the dissolution method are usually either partially immersed in a water bath solution or heated by a jacket. An apparatus is used on solution within the vessels for a predetermined amount of time which depends on the method for the particular drug. The dissolution medium within the vessels are heated to 37 °C with an acceptable difference of ± 0.5 °C

The performances of dissolution apparatuses are highly dependent on hydrodynamics due to the nature of dissolution testing. The designs of the dissolution apparatuses and the ways of operating dissolution apparatuses have huge impacts on the hydrodynamics, thus the performances. Hydrodynamic studies in dissolution apparatuses were carried out by researchers over the past few years with both experimental methods and numerical modeling such as Computational Fluid Dynamics (CFD). The main target was USP Dissolution Apparatus 2. The reason is that many researchers suspect that USP Dissolution Apparatus 2 provides inconsistent and sometimes faulty data. The hydrodynamic studies of USP Dissolution Apparatus 2 mentioned above clearly showed that it does have intrinsic hydrodynamic issues which could result in problems. In 2005, Professor Piero Armenante from New Jersey Institute of Technology (NJIT) and Professor Fernando Muzzio from Rutgers University submitted a technical report to the FDA. In this technical report, the intrinsic hydrodynamic issues with USP Dissolution Apparatus 2 based on the research findings of Armenante's group and Muzzio's group were discussed.

More recently, hydrodynamic studies were conducted in USP Dissolution Apparatus 4.

== Operation ==
The general procedure for a dissolution involves a liquid known as Dissolution Medium which is placed in the vessels of a dissolution unit. The medium can range from degassed or sonicated deionized water to pH adjusted chemically-prepared solutions and mediums that are prepared with surfactants. Degassing the dissolution medium through sonication or other means is important since the presence of dissolved gases may affect results. The drug is placed within the medium in the vessels after it has reached sufficient temperature and then the dissolution apparatus is operated. Sample solutions collected from dissolution testing are commonly analyzed by HPLC or Ultraviolet–visible spectroscopy. There are criteria known as 'release specifications' that samples tested must meet statistically, both as individual values and as average of the whole. One such criteria is the parameter "Q", which is a percentage value denoting the quantity of dissolved active ingredient within the monograph of a sample solution. If the initial sample analysis, known as S1 or stage 1 testing fails to meet the acceptable value for Q, then additional testing known as stage 2 and 3 testing is required. S3 testing is performed only if S2 testing still fails the Q parameter. If there is a deviation from the acceptable Q values at S3, then an OOS (Out of Specification) investigation is generally initiated.
