= Syncro =

Syncro may refer to:

- 4motion, a line of Volkswagen cars formerly called "Syncro"
- Fly Synthesis Syncro, an Italian ultralight aircraft
- Windtech Syncro, a Spanish paraglider design
- Syncro-Synergy Croatia, a Croatian society
- SyncroMSP, an information technology software platform

== See also ==
- synchro
