= Vaskning =

Act of pouring champagne into a sink

Vaskning (lit. 'Sinking') is the act of pouring out champagne in the sink. Sinking probably started in Sweden as "a reaction to the ban on spraying champagne in many bars" and the sinking is usually done by a person ordering two bottles of champagne and asking the bartender to pour out (sink) one of them. The term "sinking" is a translation of the Swedish term vaskning, derived from vask, which means "sink".

== Background ==
In 2007 and 2010 respectively, bars in the Swedish cities of Båstad and Visby, popular party destinations for the wealthy youth, banned the spraying of champagne. The ban referred to champagne spraying possibly violating the law's requirement on servers of alcohol to maintain good order. The ban caused some people to sink the champagne instead, while others chose to buy more expensive champagne.

According to Marie Söderqvist, CEO of the analysis company United Minds and author of the book Status – vägen till lycka (Eng. Status – the road to happiness), sinking is not just a protest against the ban on spraying champagne: "One gives the finger to everything – bans, global justice, saving the planet and equality."

== Spread and media attention ==
Sinking has been the subject of articles by national newspapers like Aftonbladet and Dagens Nyheter, but it is unclear how much sinking actually occurs. In a survey among barkeepers in Båstad, Stockholm, and Visby, one of them said they get "approximately one serious sinking request per night," while others claimed sinking was a myth.

Sinking has also been the theme of a music video by Kakan och Julia featured on Swedish Public Television.

Variants of the phenomenon have reportedly taken place, such as hamburger dumping (purchasing a large number of hamburgers at a fast food restaurant, and throwing all but one into the trash).

== See also ==
- Conspicuous consumption
- Profligate
