= Superhydrophobic coating =

Water-repellant coating

A superhydrophobic coating is a thin surface layer that repels water. It is made from superhydrophobic (also known as ultrahydrophobic) materials, and typically cause an almost imperceptibly thin layer of air to form on top of a surface. Droplets hitting this kind of coating can fully rebound. Generally speaking, superhydrophobic coatings are made from composite materials where one component provides the roughness and the other provides low surface energy.

Superhydrophobic coatings are also found in nature; they appear on plant leaves, such as the lotus leaf, and some insect wings.

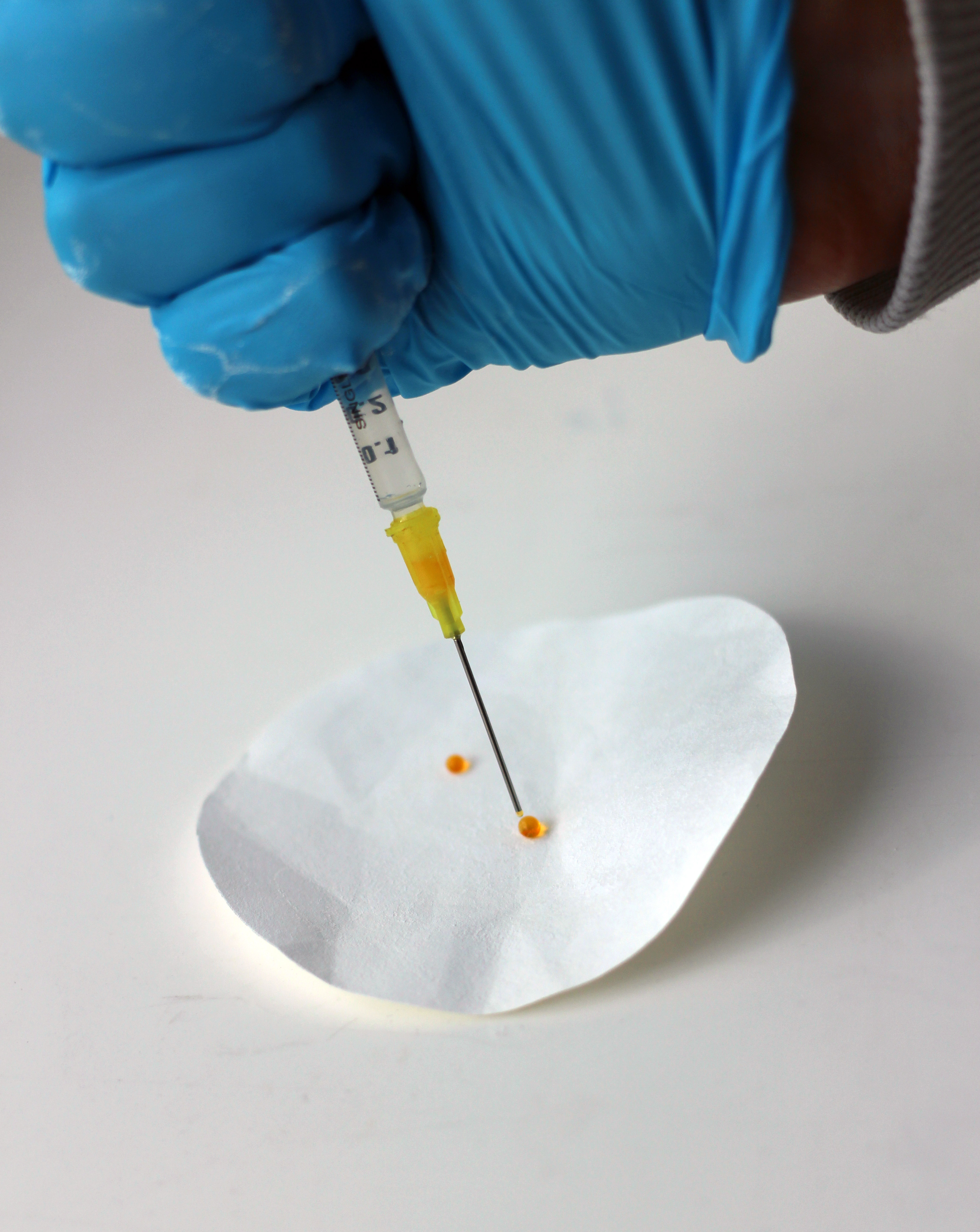
This image shows highly absorbent filter paper coated with a super-hydrophobic paint developed at University College London. This repels water (which has been dyed orange for greater contrast)

== Materials used ==
Superhydrophobic coatings can be made from many different materials. The following are known possible bases for the coating:

- Manganese dioxide polystyrene (MnO_{2}/PS) nano-composite
- Zinc oxide polystyrene (ZnO/PS) nano-composite
- Precipitated calcium carbonate
- Carbon nano-tube structures
- Silica nano-coating
- Fluorinated silanes and fluoropolymer coatings.

The silica-based coatings are perhaps the most cost effective to use. They are gel-based and can be easily applied either by dipping the object into the gel or via aerosol spray. In contrast, the oxide polystyrene composites are more durable than the gel-based coatings, however the process of applying the coating is much more involved and costly. Carbon nano-tubes are also expensive and difficult to produce with current technology. Thus, the silica-based gels remain the most economically viable option at present.

Surfaces may also be made hydrophobic without the use of coating through altering their surface microscopic contours. The basis of hydrophobicity is the creation of recessed areas on a surface whose wetting expends more energy than bridging the recesses expends. This relies on delicate micro- and nanoscale structures for their water repellence, and is accomplished using microstructures (or hairs) similar to that of a lily pad coated with some hydrophobic material, which greatly increases contact angle and makes water roll off. This so-called Wenzel-effect surface or lotus effect surface has less contact area by an amount proportional to the recessed area, giving it a high contact angle. The recessed surface has a proportionately diminished attraction to foreign liquids or solids and permanently stays cleaner. These microstructures however, are easily damaged by abrasion or cleaning: with some friction, a lotus leaf will no longer be superhydrophobic. Unlike a lotus leaf which can heal and grow new hairs, an inert coating will not regenerate.

== Applications ==
=== Consumer uses ===
Durable water repellent is a type of fabric coating to protect them from water.

In addition, superhydrophobic coatings have potential uses in vehicle windshields to prevent rain droplets from clinging to the glass, to improve driving visibility. Rain repellent sprays are commercially available for car windshields.

Due to their fragility, superhydrophobic coatings can find usage in sealed environments which are not exposed to wear or cleaning, such as electronic components (like the inside of smartphones) and air conditioning heat transfer fins, to protect from moisture and prevent corrosion.

=== Industry uses ===
In industry, super-hydrophobic coatings are used in ultra-dry surface applications. The coating can be sprayed onto objects to make them waterproof. The spray is anti-corrosive and anti-icing; has cleaning capabilities; and can be used to protect circuits and grids.

Superhydrophobic coatings have important applications in maritime industry. They can yield skin friction drag reduction for ship hulls, thus increasing fuel efficiency. Such a coating would allow ships to increase their speed or range while reducing fuel costs. They can also reduce corrosion and prevent marine organisms from growing on a ship's hull.

Furthermore, superhydrophobic coatings can make removal of salt deposits possible without using fresh water. This has the ability to aid harvesting minerals from seawater brine.

Newer engineered surface textures on stainless steel are extremely durable and permanently hydrophobic. Optically these surfaces appear as a uniform matte surface but microscopically they consist of rounded depressions one to two microns deep over 25% to 50% of the surface. These surfaces are produced for buildings which will never need cleaning. These have been effectively used for roofs and curtain walls of structures that benefit from low or no maintenance.

=== Medical ===
Due to the extreme repellence and in some cases bacterial resistance of hydrophobic coatings, there are potential uses on surgical tools, medical equipment, textiles, and all sorts of surfaces and substrates. However, the current state of the art for this technology is hindered in terms of the weak durability of the coating making it unsuitable for most applications.

== Criticism ==
Instead of using fluorine atoms for repellence like many successful hydrophobic penetrating sealers (not super hydrophobic), superhydrophobic products are coated with a micro- and nano-sized surface structures which has super-repellent properties. These tiny structures are by their nature very delicate and easily damaged by wear, cleaning or any sort of friction; if the structure is damaged even slightly it loses its superhydrophobic properties.

Due to the fragility of certain coatings, objects subject to constant friction like boats hulls would require constant re-application of such a coating to maintain a high degree of performance.

Despite the many applications of superhydrophobic coatings, safety for the environment and for workers can be potential issues. The International Maritime Organization has many regulations and policies about keeping water safe from potentially dangerous additives.

Unless advancements can resolve these identified weaknesses above, the applications are potentially limited.

== See also ==
- Biomimetics
- Hydrophobe
- Non-stick surface
- Plant cuticle
- Polytetrafluoroethylene
- Ultrahydrophobicity
