= Blue-collar worker =

Working-class person who performs manual labour

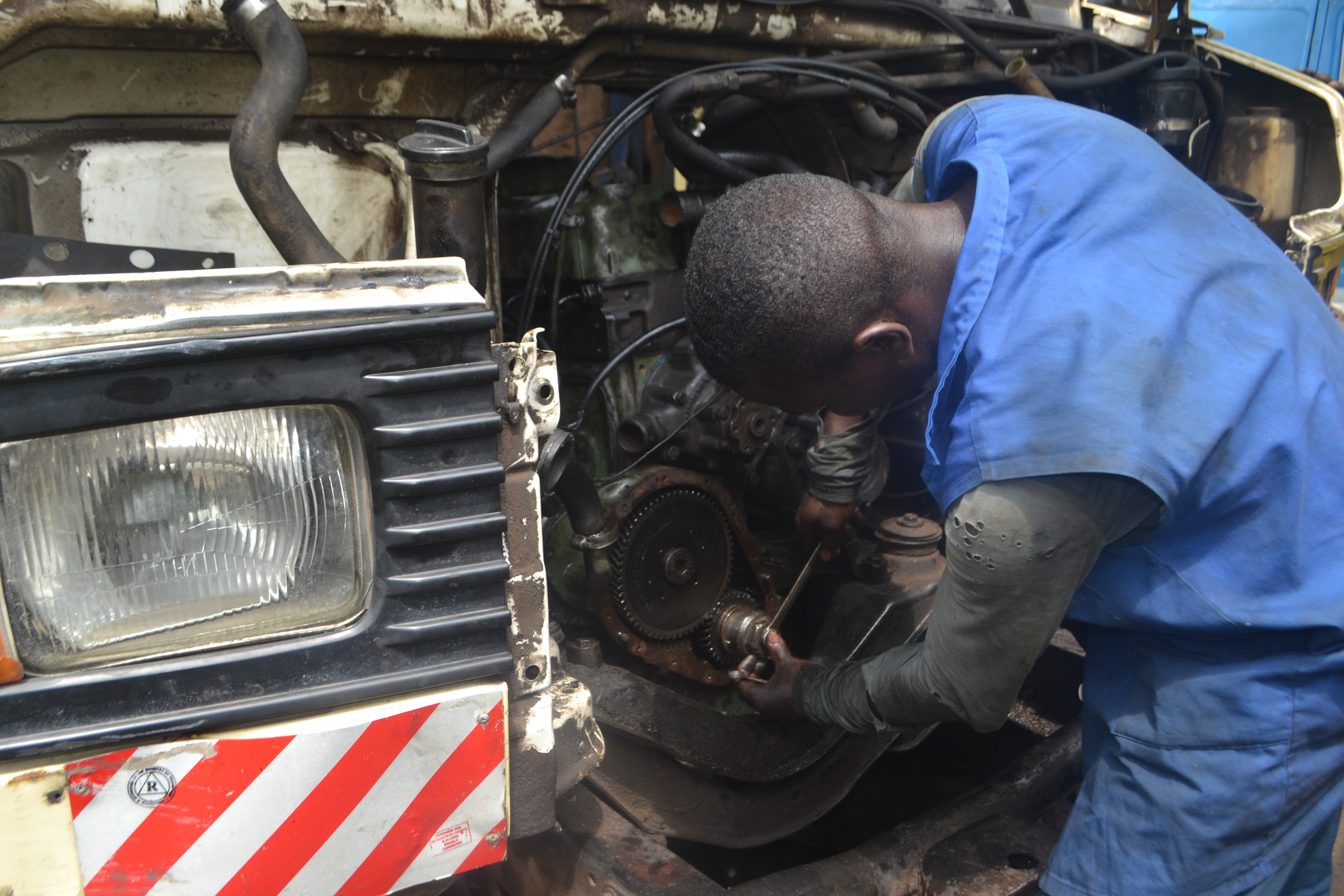
A mechanic at work wearing blue coveralls

A blue-collar worker is a person who performs manual labor or skilled trades. Originating and used most frequently in the United States, the term 'Blue-collar work' may involve skilled or unskilled labor. The type of work may involve manufacturing, warehousing, mining, carpentry, electrical work, custodial work, agriculture, logging, landscaping, food processing, waste collection and disposal, construction, shipping, and many other types of physical work that typically do not require higher education. Blue-collar work often involves something being physically built or maintained. In social status, blue-collar workers generally belong to the working class.

In contrast, the white-collar worker typically performs work in an office environment and may involve sitting at a computer or desk. A third type of work is a service worker (pink collar) whose labor is related to customer interaction, entertainment, sales or other service-oriented work — particularly those service jobs that have been traditionally considered to be women's work, such as secretaries, nurses, teachers, early childhood educators, florists, etc. Many occupations blend blue, white, or pink-collar work and are often paid hourly wage-labor, although some professionals may be paid by the project or salaried. There are a wide range of payscales for such work depending upon field of specialty and experience.

== Origin of term ==
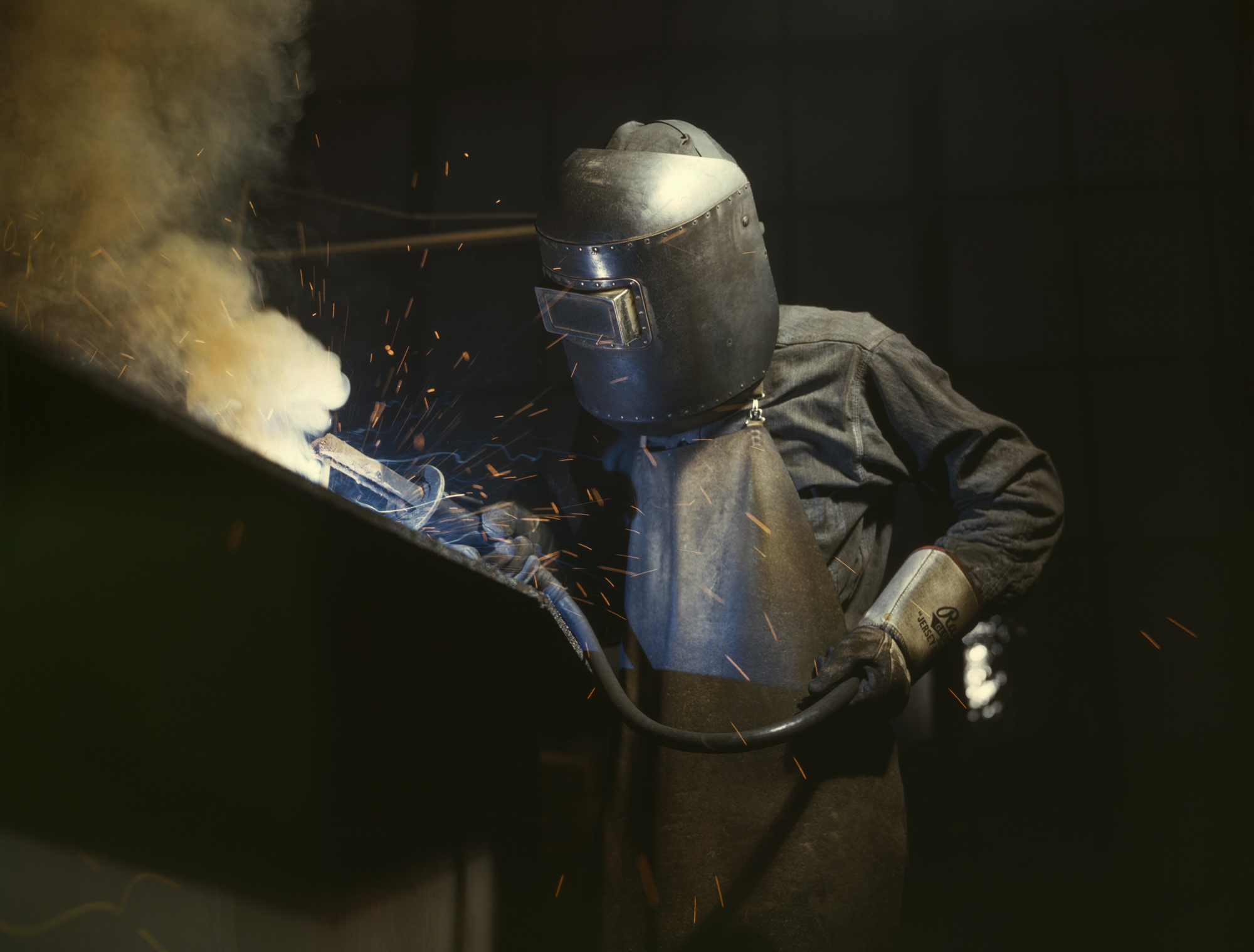
A welder making boilers at the Combustion Engineering Company in Chattanooga, Tennessee in June 1942. Despite their name, blue-collar workers do not always or typically wear blue shirts.

The term blue collar was first used in reference to trades jobs in the United States in 1924, in an Alden, Iowa newspaper. The phrase stems from the image of manual workers wearing blue denim or chambray shirts as part of their uniforms. Industrial and manual workers often wear durable canvas or cotton clothing that may be soiled during the course of their work. Navy and light blue colors conceal potential dirt or grease on the worker's clothing, helping them to appear cleaner. For the same reason, blue is a popular color for boilersuits that protect workers' clothing. Some blue collar workers have uniforms with the name of the business or the individual's name embroidered or printed on it.

Historically, the popularity of the colour blue among manual labourers contrasts with the popularity of white dress shirts worn by people in office environments. The blue collar/white collar colour scheme has socio-economic class connotations. However, this distinction has become blurred with the increasing importance of skilled labor, and the relative increase in low-paying white-collar jobs.

== Educational requirements ==
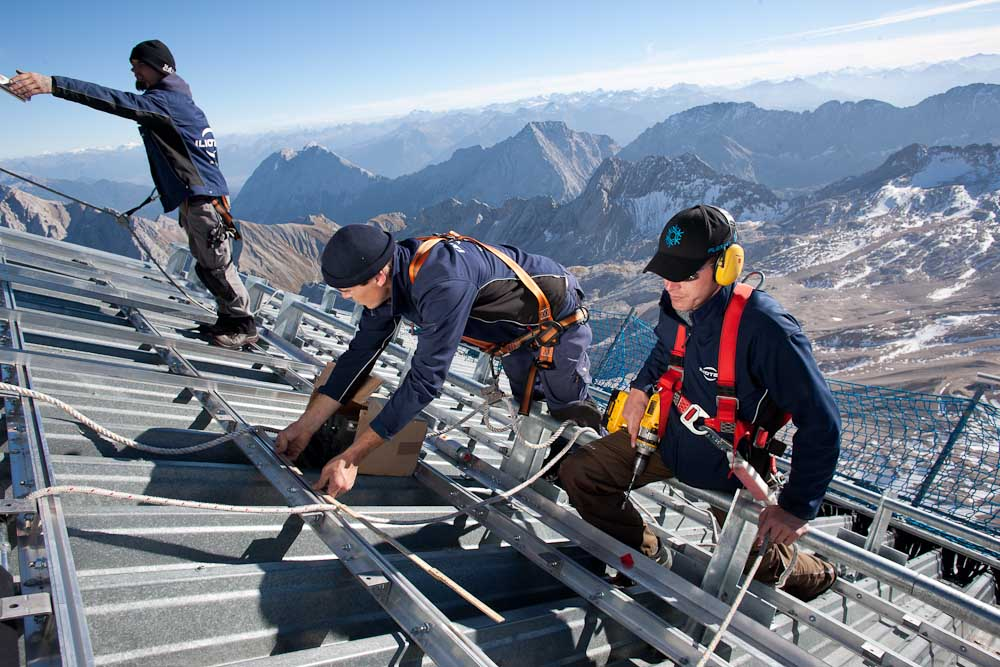
Workers constructing a photovoltaic system on the Zugspitze, Germany

Since many blue-collar jobs consist of mainly manual labor, educational requirements for workers are typically lower than those of white-collar workers. Often, not even a high school diploma is required, and many of the skills required for blue-collar jobs are learned by the employee while working. In higher-level blue collar jobs, such as becoming an electrician or plumber, vocational training or apprenticeships are required and official certification is also necessary. For this reason, it is common to apply the label "blue collar" or "working class" to people without a college education, whether or not they work in a blue-collar job. Some people in academic-related jobs and studies who were raised by parents or belong to families that are predominately blue-collar may take on some of the habits, processes, and philosophies utilized by laborers and workers. Some of these students, staff, and faculty refer to themselves as blue-collar scholars.

== Blue collar shift to developing nations ==
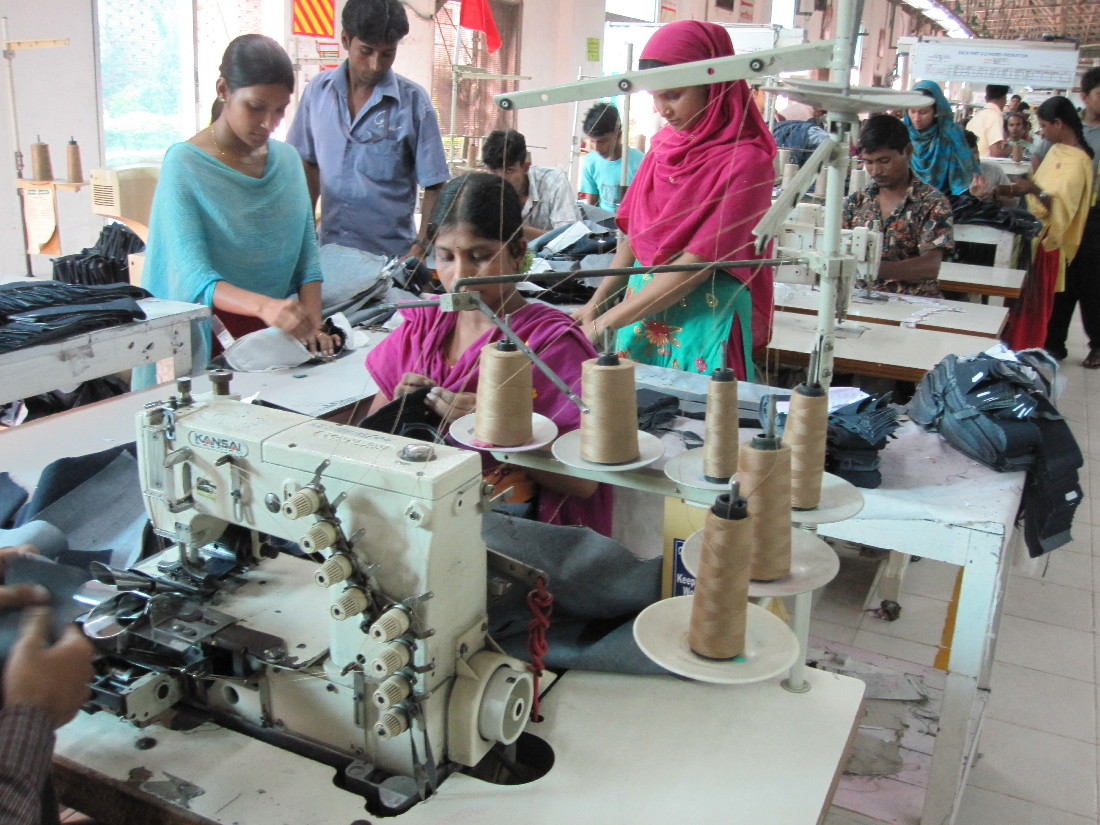
A textile factory outside Dhaka, Bangladesh

With the Information Age, Western nations have moved towards a service and white-collar economy. Many manufacturing jobs have been offshored to developing nations which pay their workers lower wages. This offshoring has pushed formerly agrarian nations to industrialized economies and concurrently decreased the number of blue-collar jobs in developed countries. However, in many of these countries, such as the United States, the supply of blue collar labor (especially skilled trades) has declined faster than demand for these services has fallen. Driven by a gradually aging blue collar workforce and shifting preferences towards higher education, this trend was exacerbated during the COVID pandemic.

In the U.S., blue collar and service occupations generally refer to jobs in precision production, craft, and repair occupations; machine operators and inspectors; transportation and moving occupations; handlers, equipment cleaners, helpers, and laborers.

=== Rust Belt ===
In the U.S., an area known as the Rust Belt, comprising the Northeast and Midwest, including Western New York and Western Pennsylvania, has seen its once large manufacturing base shrink significantly. With the deindustrialization of these areas beginning in the mid-1960s and accelerating throughout the late 20th century, cities like Allentown, Bethlehem, Erie, and Pittsburgh in Pennsylvania; Cleveland, Toledo, and Youngstown in Ohio; Detroit in Michigan; Buffalo and Rochester in New York; and St. Louis in Missouri experienced a steady decline of their blue-collar workforce, subsequent population decreases, and high unemployment, poverty, and urban blight associated with Rust Belt economies.

== Adjective ==
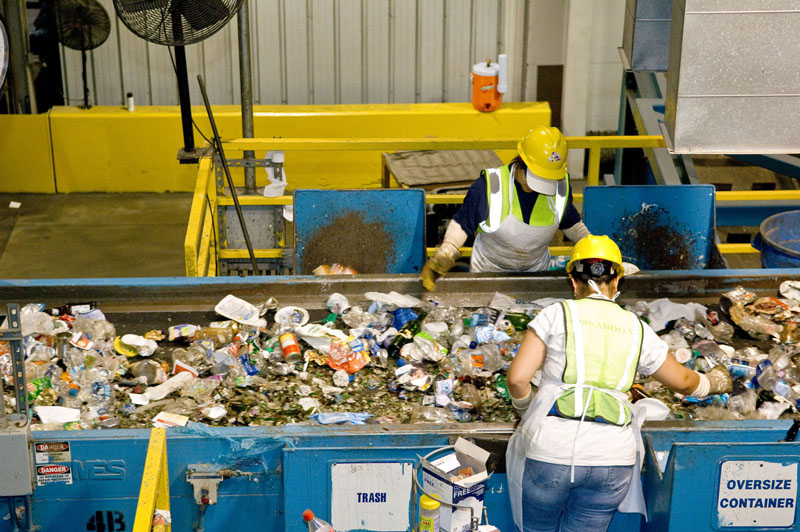
Workers in a recycling facility in Maryland, U.S.

Blue-collar can be used as an adjective to describe the environment of the blue-collar worker or a setting reflective of that environment, such as a "blue-collar" neighborhood, restaurant, or bar.

== Blue-collar jobs ==
- Able seaman
- Aerial lift operator
- Air cargo handler
- Aircraft mechanic
- Aircraft marshaller
- Arborist
- Armored truck driver
- Assembly line worker
- Asphalt paver operator
- Auto body technician
- Autorack loader
- Auto mechanic
- Automation technician
- Backhoe operator
- Baggage handler
- Bagger
- Baker
- Barber
- Barge operator
- Beekeeper
- Bicycle courier
- Blacksmith
- Blaster
- Boatswain
- Boilermaker
- Bookbinder
- Box truck driver
- Bricklayer
- Bridge tender
- Bulldozer operator
- Busboy
- Bus driver
- Butcher
- Cabinetmaker
- Car carrier driver
- Carpenter
- Carpet layer
- Cashier
- Chauffeur
- Chef
- Cold storage operator
- CNC machinist
- CNC operator
- Coach bus driver
- Commercial diver
- Concrete finisher
- Concrete mixer truck driver
- Concrete pump operator
- Conductor (train crew)
- Construction worker
- Cordwainer
- Courier
- Cowboy
- Crane operator
- Crossing guard
- Delivery driver
- Derrickhand
- Diesel mechanic
- Directional drilling operator
- Dishwasher
- Dockworker
- Dredger operator
- Driller (oil)
- Drilling rig operator
- Dry cleaner
- Drywall mechanic
- Dump truck operator
- Electrician
- Electronics technician
- Elevator mechanic
- Embroiderer
- EMT
- Excavator operator
- Farmer or Farmworker
- Farrier
- Feller
- Fencer
- Firefighter
- Fire lookout
- Fisherman
- Flatbed truck driver
- Flagger
- Food delivery courier
- Foreman
- Forester
- Forklift operator
- Framer
- Garbage truck driver
- Gardener
- General contractor
- Gig worker
- Glassblower
- Glazier
- Grader operator
- Grain bin operator
- Grain elevator operator
- Grocery delivery driver
- Grocery store worker
- Hairstylist
- Harvester (forestry)
- Heavy equipment operator
- Hopper trailer driver
- HVAC technician
- Industrial mechanic
- Ironworker
- Janitor
- Jeweler
- Joiner
- Knitter
- Laborer
- Landscaper
- Leatherworker
- Lineman
- Livestock transporter
- Loader operator
- Lock and dam operator
- Logging truck driver
- Longshoreman
- Lowboy trailer driver
- Lumberjack
- Machine operator
- Machinist
- Mail carrier
- Maintenance worker
- Mason
- Material handler
- Mechanic
- Merchandiser
- Miller
- Milliner
- Miner
- Moldmaker
- Motorman (ship)
- Oil platform roughneck
- Oil terminal operator
- Oiler
- Order picker
- Ordinary seaman
- Oversize load operator
- Overhead crane operator
- Painter and decorator
- Package delivery driver
- Papermaker
- Parachute rigger
- Patternmaker
- Personal shopper
- Photovoltaic system installer
- Pile driver operator
- Pipefitter
- Pipelayer
- Pipeline operator
- Plant operator
- Plasterer
- PLC technician
- Plumber
- Police officer
- Potter
- Printer
- Pumpman
- Pushback tractor operator
- Quilter
- Railcar switching operator
- Railroad engineer
- Ranch hand
- Reach stacker operator
- Refrigerated truck driver
- Retail clerk
- Rideshare driver
- Rigger
- Road roller operator
- Roadheader operator
- Roofer
- Roustabout
- Rubber tapper
- Sailmaker
- Sanitation worker
- Saturation diver
- Sawfiler
- Sawyer (occupation)
- Scaffolder
- School bus driver
- Scrapyard worker
- Seamstress
- Sheep shearer
- Sheet metal worker
- Shepherd
- Shipbuilder
- Shipfitter
- Shoemaker
- Sidelifter operator
- Signalman
- Skid-steer loader operator
- Slater
- Smelter
- Smokejumper
- Snowplower
- Spotter
- Sprinkler fitter
- Steel fixer
- Steelworker
- Steeplejack
- Stonemason
- Straddle carrier operator
- Stump grinder
- Surveyor
- Switch operator
- Tailor
- Tank truck driver
- Taxidermist
- Taxicab driver
- Telecommunications technician
- Telehandler operator
- Tool and die maker
- Tool pusher
- Towboat operator
- Tow truck driver
- Tower climber
- Track renewal train operator
- Travel lift operator
- Tree planter
- Trencher operator
- Tram driver / motorman
- Truck driver
- Tugboat operator
- Tunnel boring machine operator
- Upholsterer
- Utility locator
- Valet
- Warehouse worker
- Weigh station operator
- Welder
- Well logging technician
- Yard spotter

== See also ==
- List of manufacturing occupations
- Lists of occupations
