= List of construction occupations =

Occupations in construction and the built environment

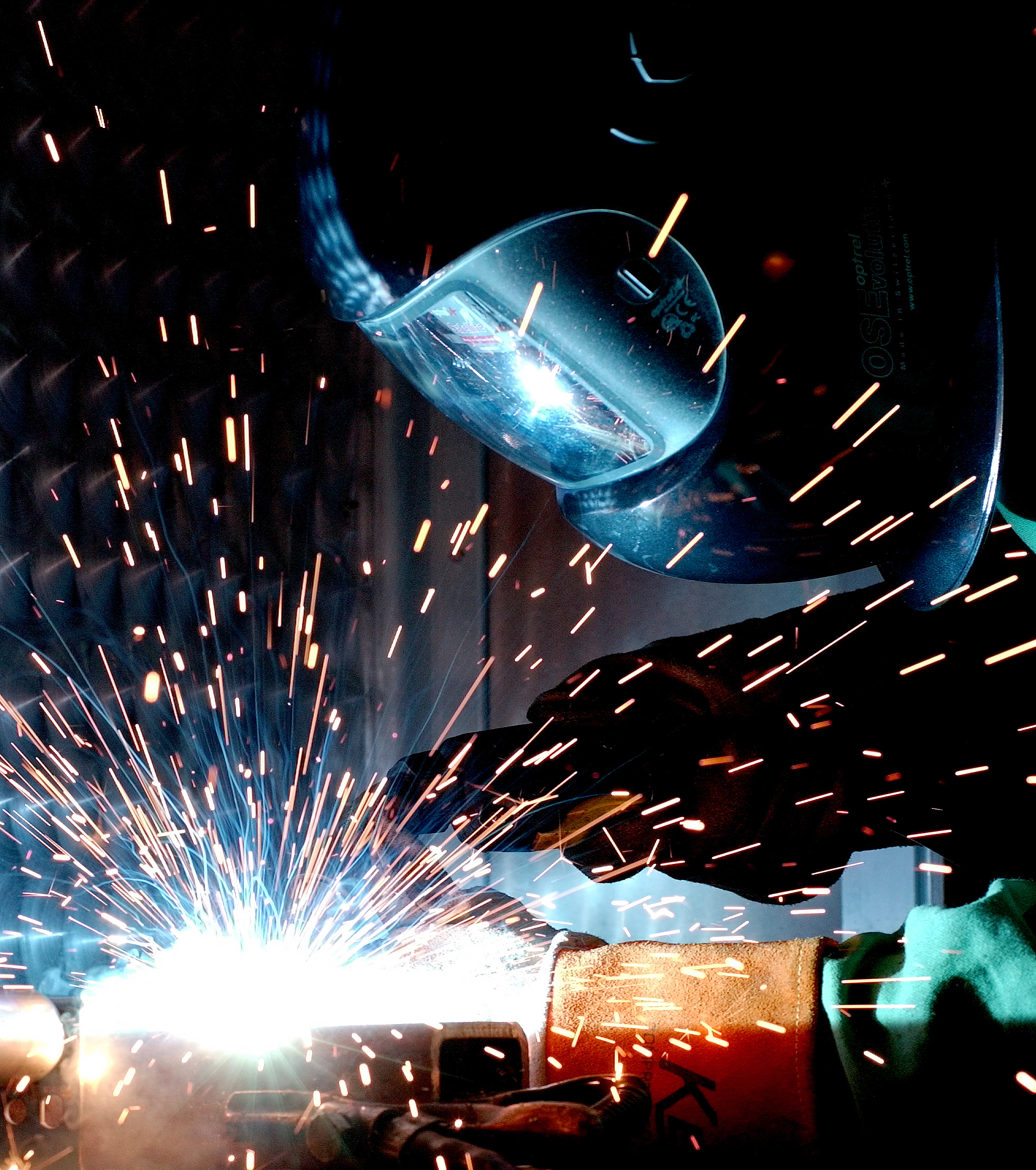
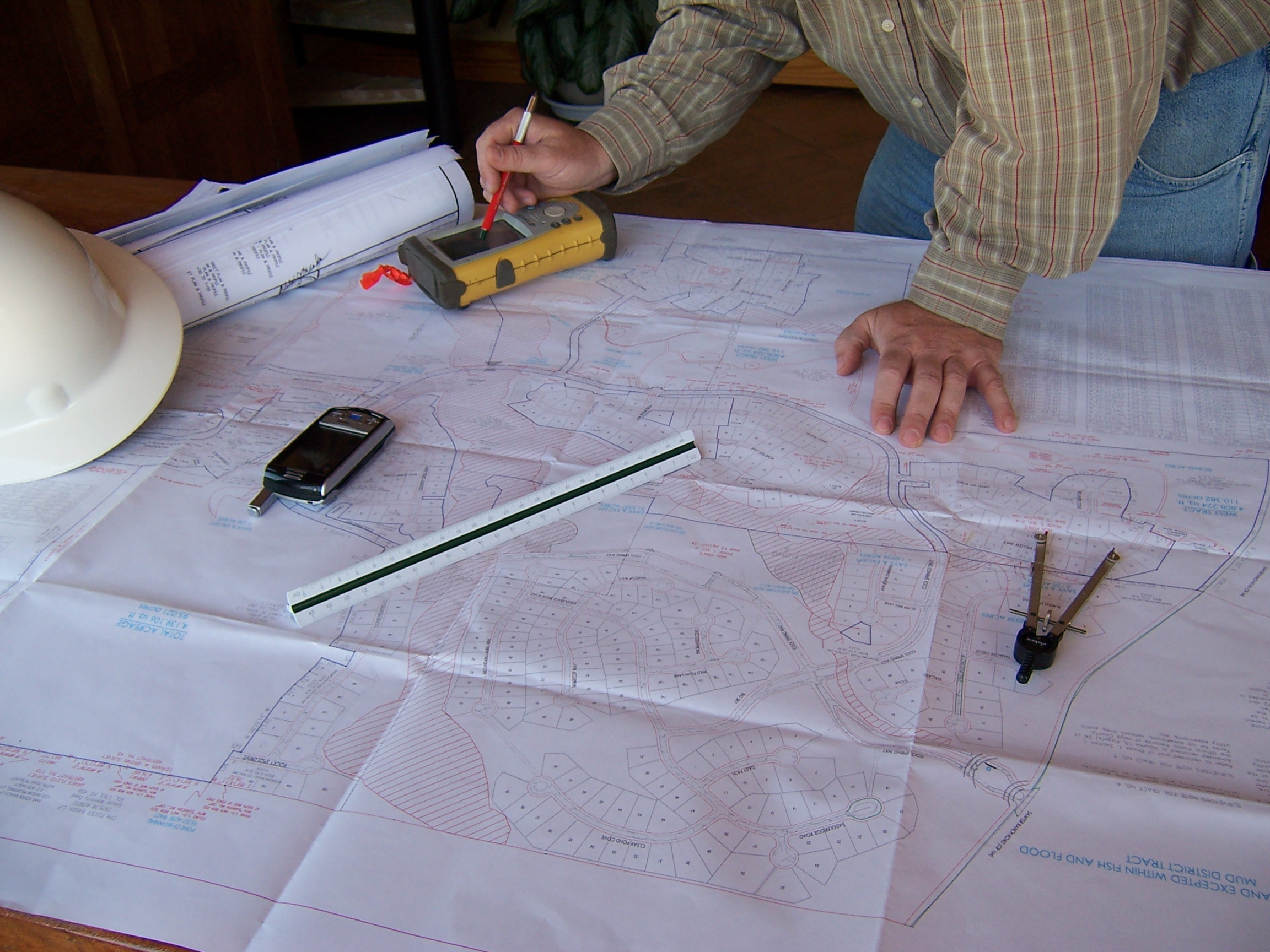
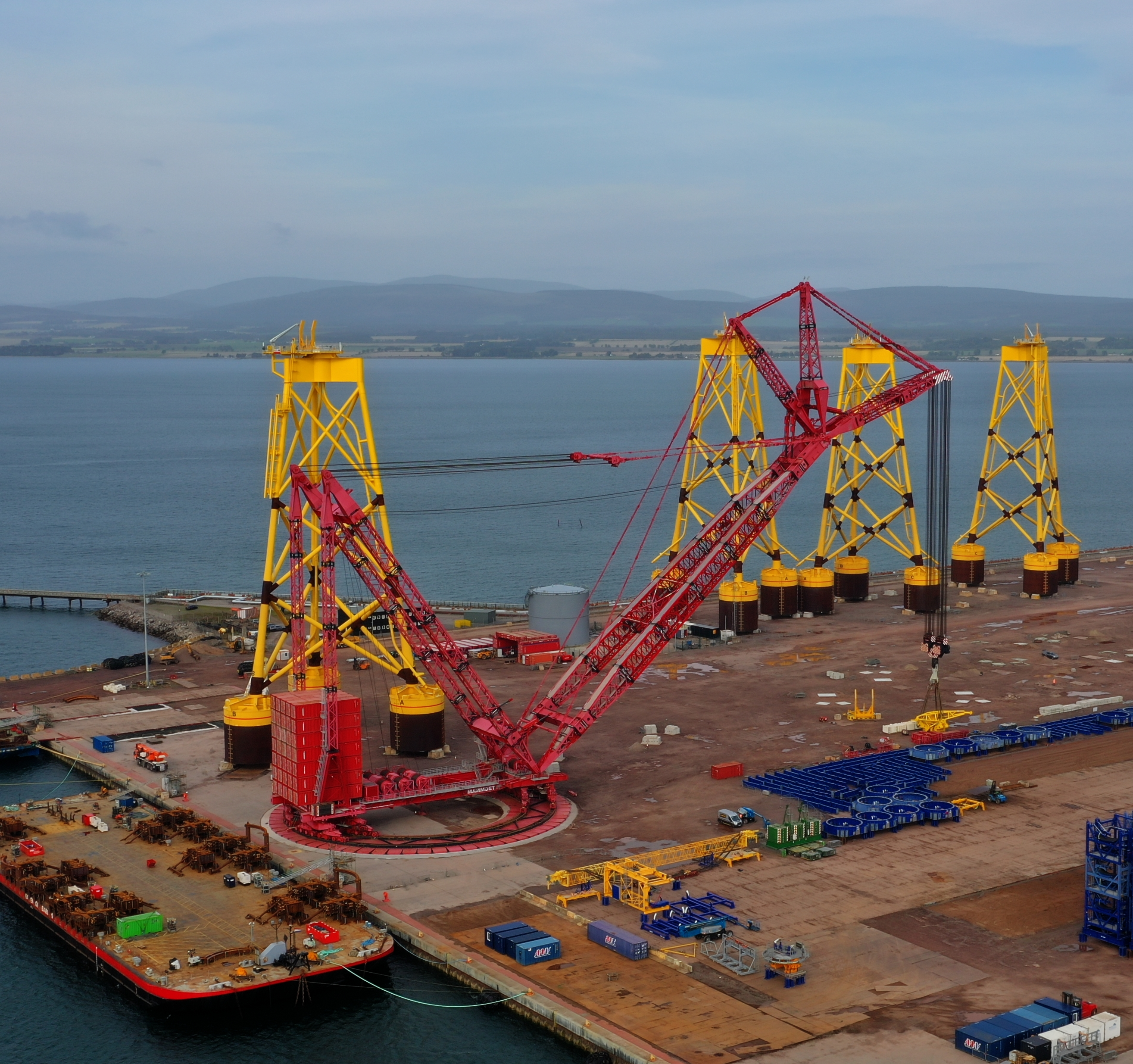

This is a list of construction occupations, including professional, technical, managerial, skilled craft, inspection, and equipment-operating occupations involved in design, planning, construction, supervision, and inspection of buildings and infrastructure.

== Architecture and design ==
- Architect
- Architectural designer
- Architectural illustrator
- Architectural technologist
- Bridge designer
- Building designer
- CAD technician
- Garden designer
- Interior architect

- Interior designer
- Landscape architect
- Landscape designer
- Lighting designer
- Project architect
- Steel detailer
- Technical drawing
- Urban designer
- Urban planner

Construction professions pay

== Engineering ==
- Architectural engineer
- Acoustic engineer
- Building engineer
- Building services engineer
- Civil engineer
- Coastal engineer
- Construction engineer
- Design engineer
- Earthquake engineer
- Electrical engineer
- Engineering technician
- Engineering technologist
- Environmental engineer
- Fire protection engineer
- Geomatics engineer
- Geotechnical engineer
- Hydrologist
- Mechanical engineer
- MEP engineer
- Power plant engineer
- Project engineer
- Railway engineer
- Resident engineer
- Structural engineer
- Transportation engineer
- Urban engineer
- Wastewater engineer

== Construction management and supervision ==
- Construction superintendent
- Construction foreman
- Construction manager
- General contractor
- Project manager
- Site manager
- Subcontractor

== Surveying and estimating ==
- Building estimator
- Chartered Building Surveyor
- Civil estimator
- Cost engineer
- Geomatics engineer
- Land surveyor
- Photogrammetrist
- Quantity surveyor

== Construction trades ==
- Boilermaker
- Bricklayer
- Carpenter
- Carpet layer
- Concrete finisher
- Directional drilling operator
- Drywall mechanic
- Electrician
- Elevator mechanic
- Fencer
- Framer
- Glazier
- HVAC technician
- Ironworker
- Joiner

- Landscaper
- Linemen
- Mason
- Millwright
- Painter and decorator
- Pipefitter
- Pipelayer
- Plasterer
- Plumber
- Roofer
- Slater
- Sprinkler fitter
- Steel fixer
- Stonemason
- Welder

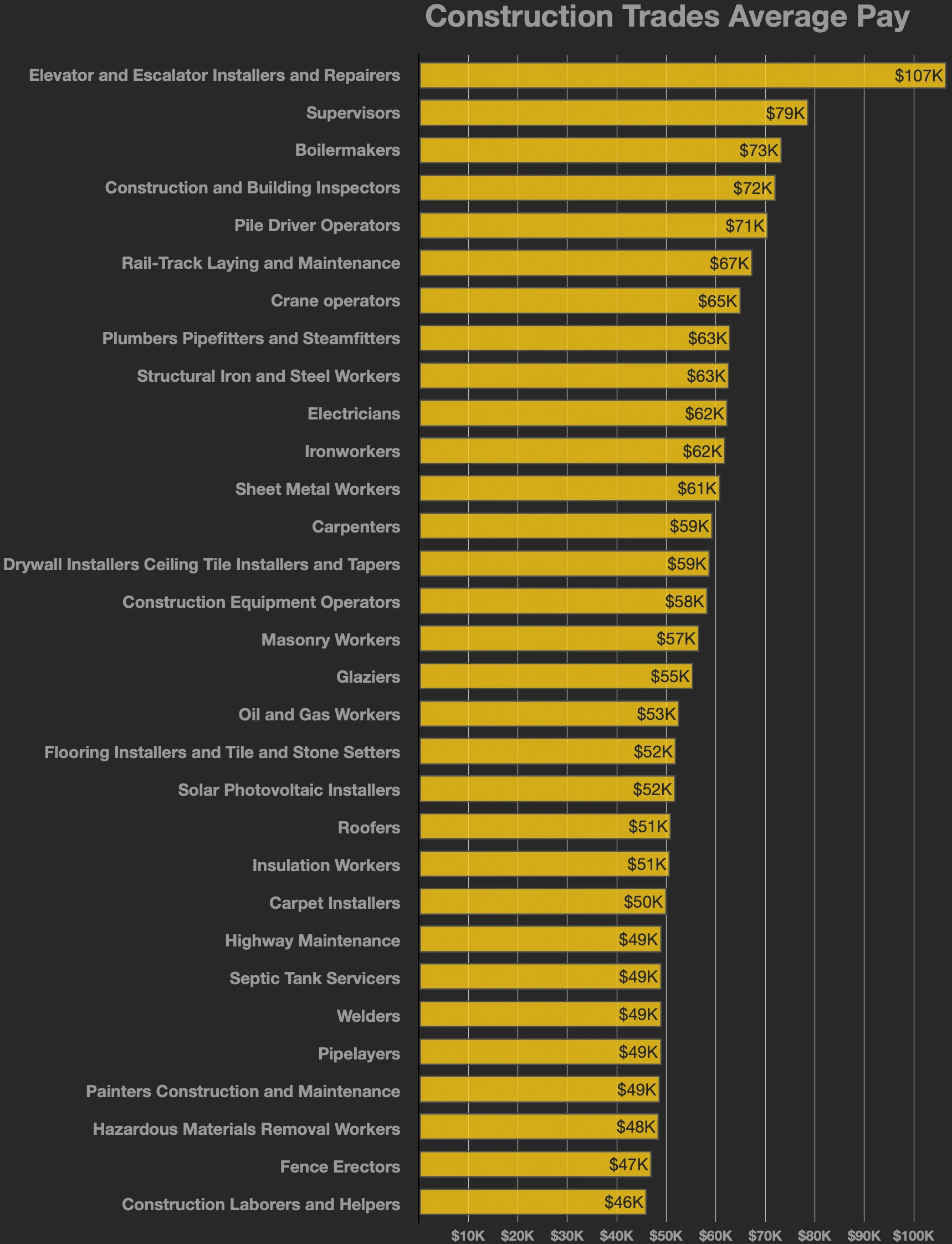
Trades average pay

== Site and equipment operations ==
Equipment operators

- Aerial lift operator
- Asphalt paver operator
- Backhoe operator
- Bulldozer operator
- Crane operator
- Directional drilling operator
- Drilling rig operator
- Dump truck operator
- Excavator operator
- Forklift operator
- Grader operator
- Loader operator
- Pile driver operator
- Road roller operator
- Skid-steer loader operator
- Telehandler operator
- Teleoperator
- Trencher operator

Site operations

- Concrete pump operator
- Construction worker
- Tower climber
- Flagger
- Laborer
- Rigger
- Scaffolder
- Signalman
- Spotter
- Steeplejack

== Offshore and marine construction ==
- Commercial diver
- Crane vessel operator
- Diving supervisor
- Dredger operator
- Dynamic positioning operator
- Heavy-lift vessel operator
- Offshore installation manager
- Saturation diver
- Wind turbine installation vessel operator

== Underground construction ==
- Blaster
- Directional drilling operator
- Drilling rig operator
- Pipelayer
- Roadheader operator
- Shaft sinker
- Tunnel boring machine operator

== Government and military construction ==
United States

- Army construction engineer
- Combat engineer
- Marine Corps construction occupations
- Navy builder
- Navy construction electrician
- Navy construction mechanic
- Navy engineering aide
- Navy equipment operator
- Navy steelworker
- Navy utilitiesman
- Navy civil engineer
- Air Force civil engineer

Other countries

- Royal Engineer
- Canadian military engineer
- Royal Australian Engineer
- Royal New Zealand Engineer

== Inspection, safety, and compliance ==
- Building inspector
- Building official
- Clerk of works
- Code enforcement officer
- Fire inspector
- Home inspector
- Safety engineer

== See also ==
- Apprenticeship
- Construction
- Craft unionism
- List of construction companies in the United States
- List of industrial occupations
- List of megaprojects
- List of tools and equipment
- Lists of engineering software
- Lists of occupations
- Navy construction jobs
- Outline of construction
