= Outline of construction =

Overview of and topical guide to construction

Hard hats, mandatory on construction sites

The following outline is provided as an overview of and topical guide to construction:

Construction – process of building or assembling infrastructure. A complex activity, large scale construction involves extensive multitasking. Normally, a job is managed by a project manager, and supervised by a construction manager, design engineer, construction engineer or project architect.

== Essence of construction ==
- Building
- Planning permission
- Nonbuilding structures including infrastructure

== Types of construction ==
- Building construction
  - Home construction
  - High-rise construction
    - Skyscraper
  - Low-rise construction
  - Industrial construction
    - Factories
    - Refineries
  - Offshore construction
  - Road construction
  - Underground construction
    - Tunnel construction

== History of construction ==
History of construction

- History of architecture
- History of the civil engineering profession
- History of the science of civil engineering
- History of structural engineering

== General construction concepts ==
A prefabricated house being assembled.

- Architecture
- Architectural engineering
- Autonomous building
- Blueprint
- Builders' rites
  - Topping out
- Building automation
- Building code
- Building construction
- Building envelope
- Building insulation
- Building material
- Civil engineering
- Cladding
- Construction and demolition waste
- Construction bidding
- Construction contract
- Construction delay
- Construction engineering
- Construction equipment theft
- Construction loan
- Construction law
- Construction management
- Construction site safety
- Construction worker
- Deconstruction (building)
- Demolition
- Design-bid-build
- Design-build
- Engineering, procurement, and construction
- Fast-track construction
- Floor plan
- Egyptian pyramid construction techniques
- Fire safety
- Framing
- Green building
- Green roof
- Industrialization of construction
- Occupancy
- Occupational safety
- Prefabricated buildings
- Project management
- Real estate (the product of most construction)
- Steel frame
- Sustainability in construction
- Zoning

=== Components of a building ===
- Escalator
- Electrical wiring
- Elevator
- Fireplace
  - Chimney
- Floor
  - Flooring
- Foundation
- Light fixtures
- Plumbing
  - Plumbing fixtures
- Roof
- Stairs
- Walls
  - Doors
  - Wallcoverings
  - Windows
- HVAC

=== Construction trades workers ===
List of construction trades

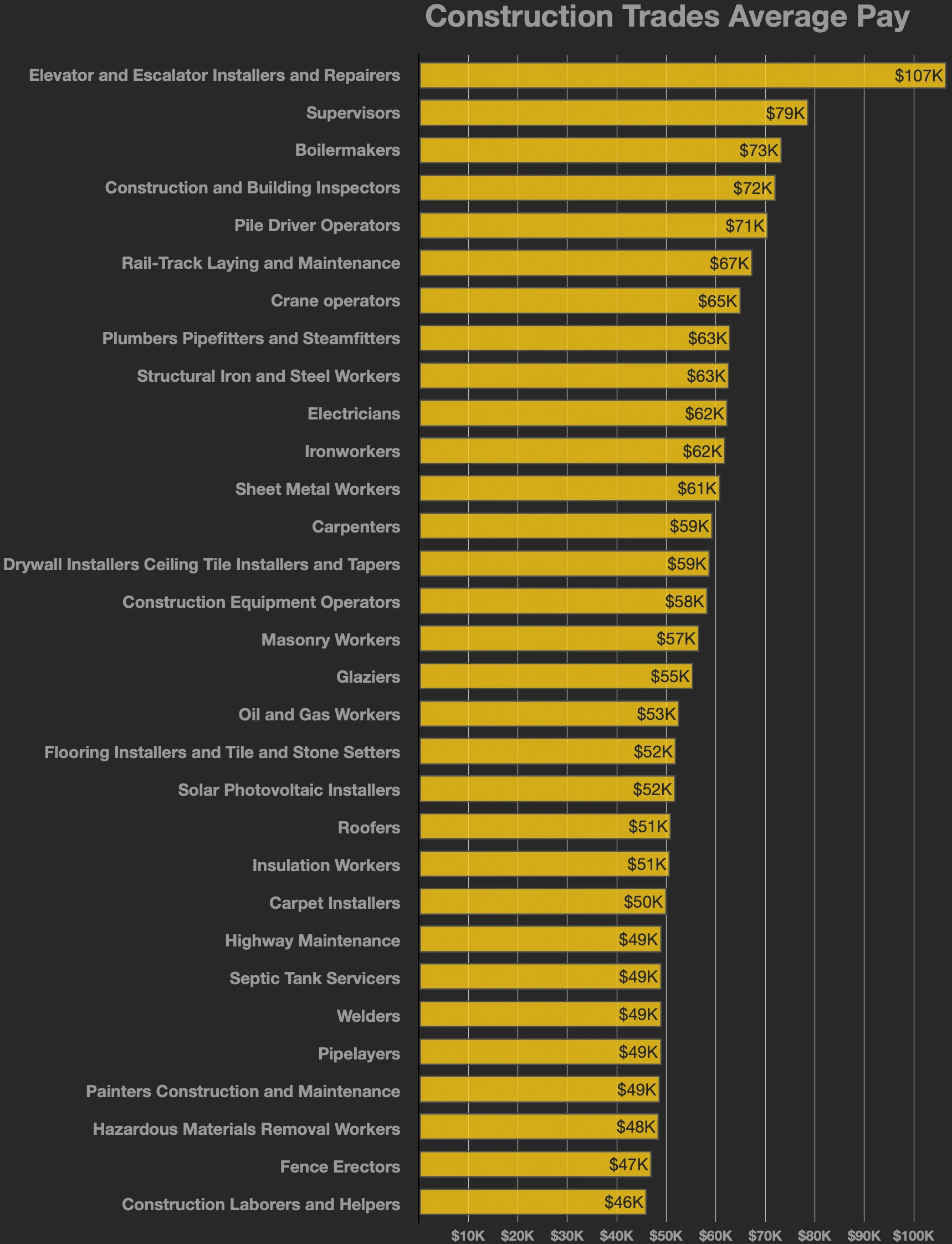
Construction trades average pay in the United States

- Banksman
- Bricklayer
- Concrete finisher
- Construction foreman
- Electrician
- Framer
- Glazier
- House painter and decorator
- Ironworker
- Joiner
- Laborer
- Millwright
- Plasterer
- Plumber
- Rigger
- Roofer
- Slater
- Steel fixer
- Welder
- Masonry

=== Design elements of a building ===
- Halls
  - Entryway
- Rooms
  - Bathroom
  - Bedroom
  - Dining room
  - Garage
  - Kitchen
  - Living room
  - Utility room

=== Heavy construction projects ===
- Bridge
- Highway

==== Heavy equipment ====
- Heavy equipment
  - Bulldozer
  - Compactor
  - Excavator
  - Loader
- Heavy equipment operator

== Building construction methods ==
List of construction methods

- Earthbag construction
- Ferrocement
- Lift slab construction
- Monocrete construction
- Slip forming

== Materials and equipment ==
List of building materials

- Category:Construction equipment
  - Category:Cutting tools
  - Category:Lifting equipment
  - Category:Metalworking tools
  - Category:Power tools
  - Category:Stonemasonry tools
  - Category:Woodworking tools
- Light tower
- Living building material
- Staff
- Temporary equipment
  - Box crib
  - Dropcloth
  - Falsework
  - Fill trestle
  - Formwork
  - Masking tape
  - Ram board
  - Scaffolding
    - Tube and clamp scaffold
  - Temporary fencing
  - Roll-off dumpster
  - Portable toilet
  - Storage container

== Roles in construction ==
- Building engineer
- Building estimator
- Building officials
- Chartered Building Surveyor
- Chief Construction Adviser to UK Government
- Civil estimator
- Clerk of works
- Construction foreman
- Master builder
- Quantity surveyor
- Site manager
- Structural engineer
- Superintendent (construction)

== See also ==
- Index of construction articles
- List of construction occupations
- List of tools and equipment
- Megaproject
- Megastructure
