= List of construction trades =

The following is a list of trades in construction.

- Boilermaker – works in nuclear, oil and gas industry, shipyards, refineries, and chemical plants, on boilers, pressure vessels, and similar equipment.
- Carpenter – a craftsperson who performs carpentry, building mainly with wood. Among carpentry's subsidiary trades are those of cabinet maker and millworker, cladder – framer, joiner, deck builder, furniture maker, interior trim carpenter, exterior trim carpenter, siding installer, and even a coffin maker. Carpenters unions usually include drywall installer, lather (wire mesh molding), flooring installer, pile driver, millwright (machinery installer), diver, and diver tender.
- Carpet layer / linoleum flooring – one who specializes in laying carpet and linoleum floor covering.
- Crane operators — certified operators of various types of cranes
- Dredger – may include Lead Dredgeman, Operator, Leverman, Licensed Tug Operator, Derrick Operator, Spider/Spill Barge Operator, Engineer, Electrician, Chief Welder, Chief Mate, Fill Placer, Operator II, Maintenance Engineer, Licensed Boat Operator, Certified Welder, Mate, Drag Barge Operator, Steward, Assistant Fill Placer, Welder, Boat Operator, Shoreman, Deckhand, Rodman, Scowman, Cook, Messman, Porter/Janitor, and Oiler.
- Electrician – specializing in electrical wiring of buildings and related equipment. Electricians may be employed in the construction of new buildings or maintenance of existing electrical infrastructure, they can also install A/C and Telecommunications systems.
- Elevator mechanic – installs vertical lift and transporting equipment.
- Fencer – a tradesperson who builds fences.
- Glazier – installs glass.
- Heavy equipment operator – a driver and operator of heavy equipment used in engineering and construction projects. There are special function titles, such as Bargeman, Brakeman, Compressor operator, Elevator operator, Engineer Oiler, Forklift operator, Generator, Pump or Compressor plant operator, Signalman, Switchman, Conveyor operator, Fireman, Skiploader operator, Helicopter radioman, Boring machine operator, Boxman or mixerman, Asphalt plant engineer, Batch plant operator, Bit sharpener, Micro tunnel system operator, Pavement breaker operator, Drill Doctor, Drilling machine operator, Rotary drill operator, Canal liner operator, Canal trimmer operator, and Concrete boom pump operator.
- HVAC Technician – specializes in service and repair of air conditioning, heating, and refrigeration systems.
- Insulation installer – Includes application of all insulating materials, protective coverings, coatings and finishes to all types of mechanical systems. Also Hazardous Material Handler (for HazMat see Laborer).
- Ironworker – (or steel erector, often includes welder), erects or dismantles structural steel frames. Structural steel installation is usually crane-assisted. Workers rely on mobile, elevated platforms or scissor lifts. Ironworkers bolt the steelwork together using various tools, power tools and manual tools. Metallic Lathers may be included in this category.
- Laborer – a skilled worker proficient with pneumatic tools, hand tools, blasting, smaller heavy equipment. Laborers may also assist other tradespeople.
- Landscaper – a tradesperson who specializes in landscaping (see Laborer).
- Linemen – high voltage line and substation construction and maintenance trade; includes trade titles under power line technicians: Electrician, Digger Machine Operator, Groundsman (unskilled electrician waiting to enter the apprenticeship).
- Mason – a tradesperson skilled variously in brick and blocklaying, concrete finishing – placement, finishing, protecting and repairing of concrete in construction projects. Also stonemason, marble setter and polisher, tile setter and polisher, terrazzo worker and finisher. Hod carrier is a subsidiary trade (also see Laborer).
- Millwright – installs various industrial equipment.
- Painter – a tradesperson responsible for the painting and decorating of buildings, and is also known as a decorator or house painter. Also includes Paper Hanger.
- Pile driver, a tradesperson who installs piles, drills shafts, and constructs certain foundation support elements.
- Pipefitter / steamfitter - a person who lays out, assembles, fabricates, maintains, and repairs large-sized piping systems capable of enabling high-pressure flow.
- Pipelayer – lays pipe for storm sewers, sanitary sewers, pipelines, drains, and water mains. May also grade trenches and culverts.
- Plasterer – a tradesperson who works with plaster, such as forming a layer of plaster on an interior wall or plaster decorative moldings on ceilings or walls.
- Plumber – a tradesperson who specializes in installing and maintaining systems used for plumbing(drain systems), heating, drainage, fire fighting, potable (drinking) water or small-sized industrial process plant piping.
- Roofer – a tradesperson who specializes in roof construction. Roofers replace, repair, and install the roofs of buildings.
- Sheet Metal Worker – A person who makes, installs and maintains sheet-metal structures such as roofing and ventilation ducts. Many can be seen as specialised roofers.
- Sign display worker.
- Steel fixer – ("ironworker" USA, also "rodbuster" USA/Australia), a tradesperson who positions and secures reinforcing bars and mesh used to reinforce concrete on construction projects. This trade is usually included with Ironworkers.
- Truck driver– operator of highway trucks used to haul heavy loads on paved roadways.
- Welder – a tradesperson who specialises in welding.

Among the construction trades, in most industrialized countries, each has a distinct 2-5 year craft apprenticeship education and usually once started a worker remains in a single craft and progresses through ranks of skill for the duration of their career (pre-apprentice, apprentice, and journeyman; some countries include a post-journeyman 'master' level, which in other countries is a company title like leadman, foreman, and superintendent). While not as formalized in laws as in industrialized countries, the same situation is true through craft traditions in non-industrialized countries.

== See also ==
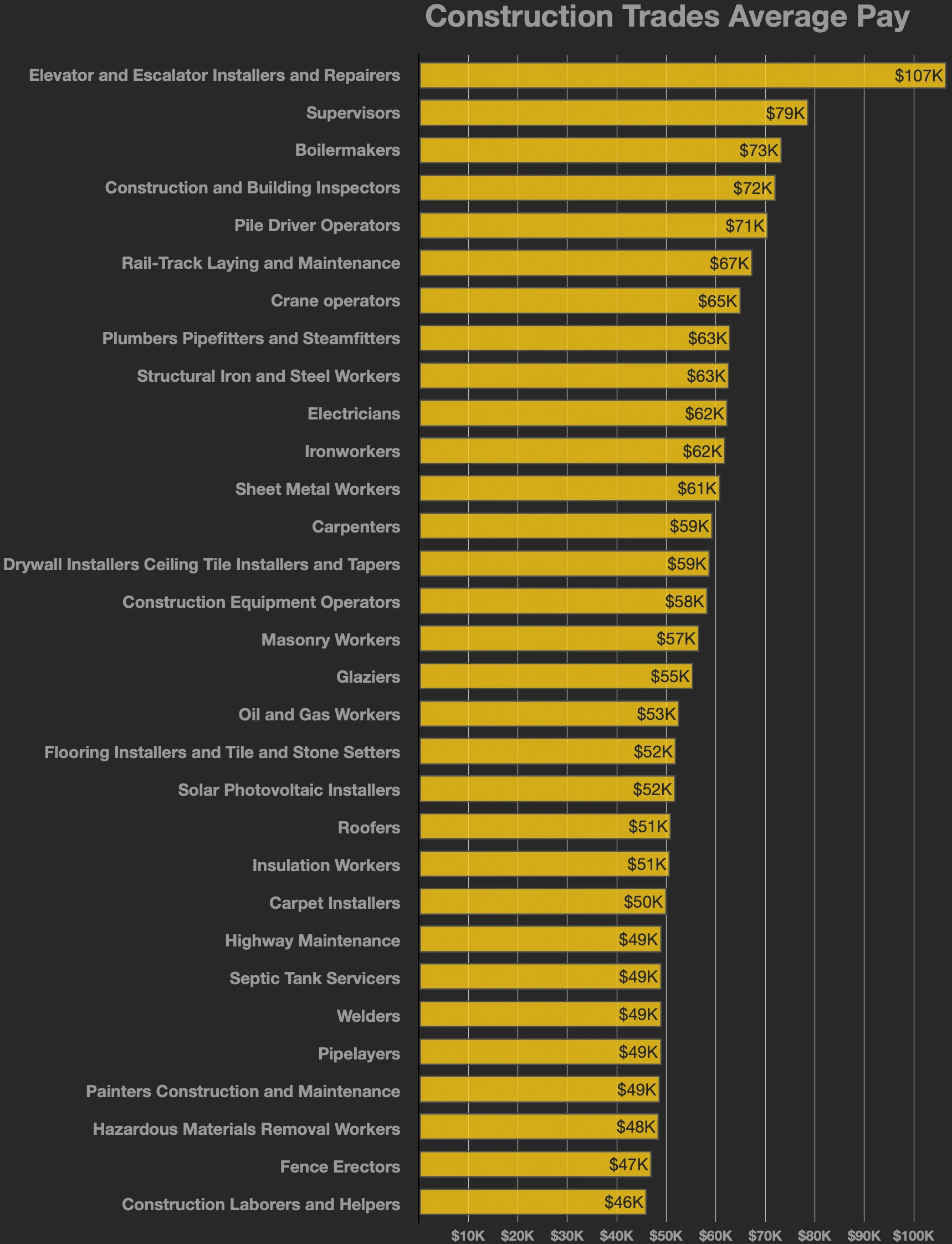
Construction trades average pay

- Apprenticeship
- Career and Technical Education
- Construction worker
- Civil engineering
- Common Arrangement of Work Sections (CAWS)
- Dirty, Dangerous and Demeaning
- Index of construction articles
- List of building information modeling software
- List of construction occupations
- List of tools and equipment
- Lists of occupations
- List of petroleum industry occupations
- National Center for Construction Education and Research
- Outline of construction
- Tech ed trades
