= Builderscrack.co.nz =

New Zealand internet marketplace

- Type: solely owned subsidiary of hipages Group PTY LTD
- Industry: Home Services
- Founded: 2006
- Headquarters: New Zealand
- Area served: New Zealand
- Key people: Jeremy Wyn-Harris co-founder / General Manager
- Services: Online marketplace for builders and tradespeople
- Website: builderscrack.co.nz

Builderscrack.co.nz is a New Zealand based website that provides an internet marketplace where homeowners may post jobs, and where builders and tradespeople can bid for jobs, provide quotes and win work. Homeowners then rate tradespeople on how well they complete the job.

== Concept ==
Builderscrack.co.nz is a website where homeowners post jobs, giving the necessary details of the work they need completed, and the tradespeople submit quotes to get the respective work done. A user rating and review system is provided to keep track of the reputation of the service providers, allowing the homeowners to make their decision on factors other than solely price, and providing an incentive for tradespeople to do a good job. A cost-estimating tool can give a rough estimate to the prospective clients for their building, renovation or repair work before getting a quote.

Registration (required) is free for both homeowners and tradespeople. The winning bid is subject to a transaction based fee, the cost of which is borne by the tradesperson. For the providers there is available an optional account upgrade ("Builderscrack Pro") for a quarterly or annual fee, which enables several additional features: customized webpage, the possibility to chase more jobs in the same time and to appear at the top of the job chaselist, and also a 30% discount on the job-winning service fee.

The website developed as an internet market primarily for trade service related jobs in New Zealand. Occasionally, there appear job requests from abroad, like the one featured by the New Zealand television in 2009 (a New Zealander, dissatisfied by the service of the local French tradesmen, hired through Builderscrack several New Zealand tradesmen, out of over 100 applicants, to renovate a 16th-century house in France).

== History ==
The idea of an internet marketplace came after Mark Dickson, one of the co-founders, and his wife were seeking tradesmen to renovate their house: "Some tradesmen sounded keen but didn't turn up, others were simply too busy or not interested." The lack of a place to bring together supply and demand in the market for tradespeople and lack of availability of information tracking the quality of tradesmen led him and the other site co-founders to the idea of starting a website that could fulfill these requirements. The other co-founders were Jeremy Wyn-Harris, software developer, who began work on the website and Keith Roberts, business man who helped to develop the concept and market it.

The website was launched in 2006 and it gained momentum especially from 2008 onwards, helped by New Zealand's property market slump. As the market faltered, homeowners focused on improving the appearance of their homes before putting them on the market. As the economic slowdown hit, consumers became more focused on getting better deals, and increasingly looked to compare what different tradesmen could offer.

In the wake of 2010 Canterbury earthquake, the website posted a special link to match tradespeople with affected homeowners, making it easier for tradesmen from around New Zealand to be involved in the subsequent reconstruction effort.

By the beginning of 2012, the website underwent a major redesign and also added a new feature enabling the display of accreditation information, including whether builders meet the government's Licensed Building Practitioner scheme requirements.

In December 2021 Builderscrack was acquired by hipages.
