= Construction foreman =

Worker or tradesman who is in charge of a construction crew

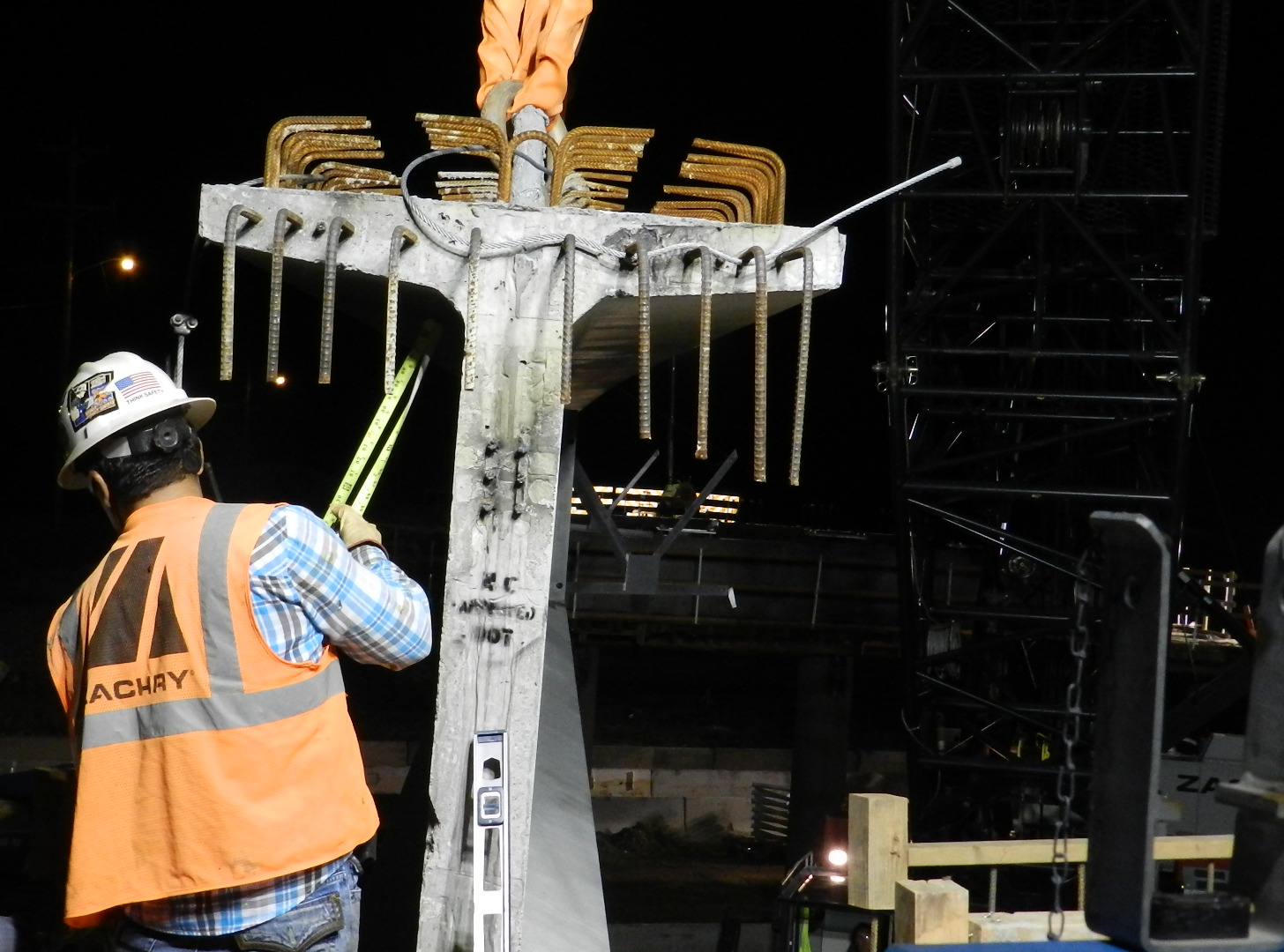
Construction foreman checking the alignment and placement of a road bridge girder

A construction foreman is the worker or skilled tradesperson who is in charge of a construction crew. This role is generally assumed by a senior worker who is seasoned and competent in their field, but also capable of project leadership (oversight and control over subordinate laborers). In a military context, a foreman is a non-commissioned officer.

== Duties and functions ==
Normally the foreman is a construction worker with many years of experience in a particular trade who is charged with organizing the overall construction of a particular project for a particular general contractor. Typically the foreman is a person with specialist knowledge of a given trade who has moved into the position and is now focused on an overall management of their trade on the job site. They are responsible for providing proper documentation to their workers so they can proceed with tasks.

Specifically, a foreman may train employees under their supervision, ensure appropriate use of equipment by employees, communicate progress on the project to a supervisor and maintain the employee schedule. Foremen may also arrange for materials to be at the construction site and evaluate plans for each construction job.

This job is not to be confused with a project manager.

== See also ==
- Civil engineering
- List of construction occupations
