= Civil estimator =

A Civil estimator is a construction professional who bids on civil projects that have gone to tender. Civil estimators typically have a background in civil engineering, construction project management, or construction supervision. Estimators are responsible for obtaining tenders, obtaining of material costs, calculation of tenders taking into consideration project management and overheads. The role of an estimator can be a very pressured one, and requires a great level of concentration, some of which will result in erratic office hours to ensure tender return dates can be achieved.

== Education and training ==
To date, there is not currently a professional qualification or regulatory body for civils estimating within the UK. As a consequence, the learning curve from a trainee estimator to senior estimator could be an undisclosed amount of time and largely falls into the responsibility of the employer and or senior estimator to determine time scale and progression of trainee estimators.

== Software ==
Commonly used civil estimating software programs include B2W Estimate by B2W Software, HCSS HeavyBid and SharpeSoft Estimator. There are also a variety of different tools used for the digitization of plans from engineers, such as PlanSwift or PrebuiltML X.

== Freelance estimating ==
Increasingly, civil estimators have been offering their services to the highest bidder on the open market.

== Estimator salaries ==
The average salary of a Civil Estimator normally falls within the following categories:

Trainee Estimator – £12,000 to £18,000 per annum.
Junior Estimator – £18,000 to £28,000 per annum.
Senior Estimator – £25,000 to £500,00 per annum.

In addition to the above salaries, civil estimators often have further incentives from cash rewards and a bonus system as an OTE.

== See also ==
- List of construction occupations
