= Construction Management Association of America =

- Abbreviation: CMAA
- Formation: 1982; 44 years ago
- Headquarters: Vienna, VA
- Location: United States
- CEO: David Leckey
- Subsidiaries: Construction Management Certification Institute
- Website: https://www.cmaanet.org/

The Construction Management Association of America (CMAA) is a non-profit and non-governmental, professional association serving the construction management industry. The Association was formed in 1982. Current membership is more than 14,000, including individual CM/PM practitioners, corporate members, and construction owners in both public and private sectors, along with academic and associate members. CMAA has 29 regional chapters.

== Standards of Practice ==
CMAA published the most recent revision of its Construction Management Standards of Practice in 2015. The SOP has been published and updated regularly by CMAA since the 1980s. It outlines standards for professional CM services in the areas of:

- Project Management
- Cost Management
- Time Management
- Quality Management
- Contract Administration
- Safety Management
- Program Management
- Sustainability
- Risk Management
- Building Information Modeling

== Certification ==
According to the Bureau of Labor statistics, there is a growing movement toward certification of construction managers. CMAA established a voluntary certification program for construction managers, known as the Certified Construction Manager (CCM) program. The Construction Manager Certification Institute was established by CMAA to oversee the organization's certification program. In 2006, the CCM program was accredited by the American National Standards Institute under the International Organization for Standardization's ISO 17024, which recognizes certification programs for conformity assessment or a "demonstration that specified requirements relating to a product, process, system, person or body are fulfilled."

The CCM certification requires individuals to possess a requisite amount of experience and/or education. The eligibility requirements are:

1. Forty-eight months' experience as a CM in the qualifying areas as defined by the Qualifications Matrix and 2. One of the following:

- An undergraduate (4-year BA/BS level) or graduate degree in construction management, architecture, engineering or construction science.
- A 2-year undergraduate degree (AA/AS level) or certificate in construction management, architecture, engineering or construction science plus 4 years' experience in general design/construction. (This experience is in addition to the 48-month CM requirement.)
- No degree/certificate in construction management, architecture, engineering or construction science plus 8 years' experience in general design/construction. (This experience is in addition to the 48-month CM requirement.)

In addition, two reference letters from a client or owner are required; they can be from any two projects that a candidate is documenting as part of their 48-month requirement. Finally, the candidate must pass the certification exam.

Most applicants are certified within 4 to 7 months of submitting their applications. The length of time it takes to become certified depends upon how quickly a candidate can submit a complete application including project documentation, how quickly the references respond, and how quickly a candidate can take and pass the CCM exam.

In 2013, the Construction Industry Institute at the University of Texas adopted the CCM as "a value-adding credential" following a joint effort to compare and harmonize CII's Construction Best Practices with the CMAA SOP, and to assure that the CCM examination measured and recognized mastery of the Best Practices.

== Education ==
In 2013, CMAA became a member society of ABET, formerly the Accreditation Board for Engineering Technologies, the leading organization accrediting undergraduate and graduate education programs in engineering and related fields. ABET has introduced a new accreditation for undergraduate programs in Construction Management, with program-specific criteria adopted in 2015.

== Advocacy ==
CMAA does host an advocacy program to represent the construction management industry before the United States Congress, federal agencies, state and local governments, and industry stakeholders. CMAA is active in several industry coalitions advocating investment in infrastructure and other industry interests.

== College of Fellows ==
A designation CMAA awards to certain members who have proven to be industry leaders and "who have made significant contributions to their organizations, the industry and their profession," according to CMAA. The College of Fellows meet consistently to discuss CM standards and issues facing the profession. The College also produces industry topic white papers and all members are particularly active in the association, often having served as past national presidents or in other leadership roles.

== Publications ==
The association produces several publications, including the Construction Management Standards of Practice which defines the standards and practices of the construction management profession. Other CMAA publications include a bi-monthly newsletter, the CM Advisor.

== Events ==
CMAA hosts two industry events every year for the construction management profession.

CMAA's signature event is its National Conference & Trade Show held every fall. The national conference offers multiple seminars which count toward CCM certification or renewal, as well as Continuing Education Units for a variety of purposes. The conference also includes an awards ceremony known as the Project Achievement Awards. CMAA designates a panel of judges to evaluate and select entries of projects with the most significant contributions to the construction management industry.

CMAA's Capital Projects Symposium is held every spring. The Symposium is designed for as a high level exploration of trends and issues affecting the delivery of capital projects and programs.

CMAA has also conducted regular surveys of owner attitudes, preferences, needs and expectations across the industry, along with research into CM/PM fees, adoption of technology, workforce concerns and other topics.
