= GreenPlumbers =

- Industry: plumbing, education
- Founded: 2001, Melbourne, Australia
- Headquarters: Melbourne, Victoria, Australia
- Area served: Australia, New Zealand, United States, Canada and Mexico
- Website: greenplumbers.com

GreenPlumbers is an international training and accreditation program designed to help plumbers and tradesman understand their role in the environment and public health. The organization's goal is to train plumbers to promote the benefits of water conservation and the reduction of greenhouse gas emissions. The focus is on changing consumer and plumbing behavior through the use of energy efficiency and water-saving technologies.

GreenPlumbers is a global brand formed by the Master Plumbers & Mechanical Services Association (MPMSAA) in Australia in 2000, as a result of the severe drought in the country. The GreenPlumbers' curriculum was developed in conjunction with RMIT University (Melbourne) and the Australian Greenhouse Gas Office.
