= Building engineer =

Construction profession

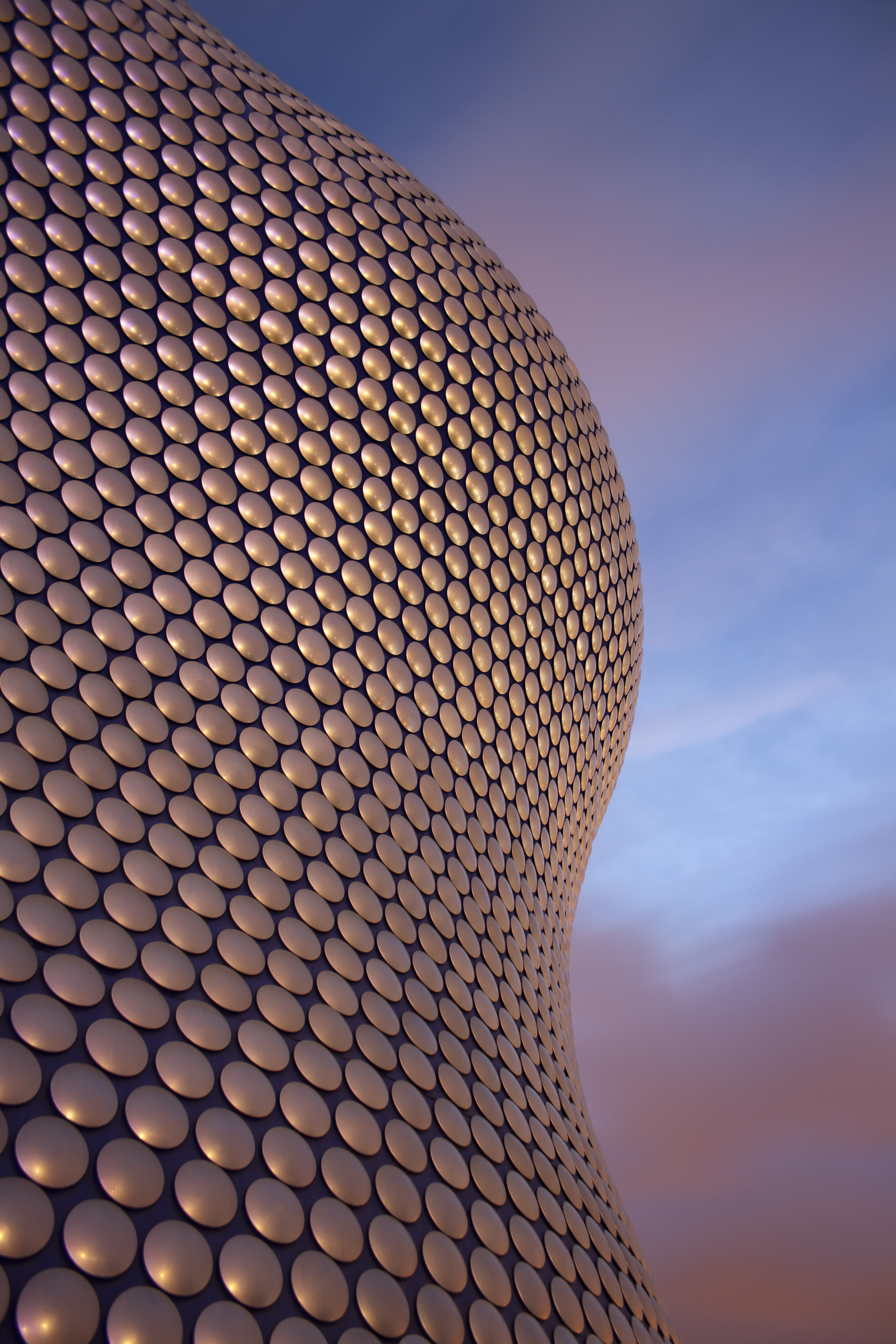

Occupation
- Names: Building engineer
- Occupation type: Profession
- Activity sectors: Design, construction, assessment and maintenance of built environment

Description
- Competencies: technical knowledge, management skills, mathematical analysis

A building engineer is recognised as being expert in the use of technology for the design, construction, assessment and maintenance of the built environment. Commercial Building Engineers are concerned with the planning, design, construction, operation, renovation, and maintenance of buildings, as well as with their impacts on the surrounding environment.

== By country ==
=== Australia ===
In Australia building engineers, also known as architectural engineers may work on new building projects, or renovations of existing structures. Areas of study include:

- architectural history and design of buildings
- air conditioning, lighting and electrical power distribution
- water supply and distribution
- fire and life safety systems
- sustainable building systems design
- building structures and building construction technology
- construction planning.

As a multifaceted build environment professional, a building engineer can provide important leadership in the design and construction of the built environment, collaborating with architects, engineers, builders and other design professionals.

=== Canada ===
In Canada, Building Engineers have to follow an interdisciplinary program that integrates pertinent knowledge from different disciplines. The building engineer explores all phases of the life cycle of a building and develops an appreciation of the building as an advanced technological system. Problems are identified and appropriate solutions found to improve the performance of the building in areas such as:

- Energy efficiency, passive solar engineering, lighting and acoustics;
- Indoor air quality;
- Construction management
- HVAC and control systems
- Advanced building materials, building envelope
- Earthquake resistance, wind effects on buildings, computer-aided design.

A building engineer can be a licensed professional, and in some countries is synonymous with an architect. Building engineers are licensed to perform whole-building design with architect-engineer teams, or as practitioners in structural, mechanical, or electrical fields of building design.

=== Europe ===
Within the European Community, building engineers are affiliated with the AEEBC (Association of European Experts in Building and Construction) one of the biggest pan-European bodies for construction professionals. The titles, tasks and duties of a building engineer may vary from one European State to another.

=== Hong Kong ===
In Hong Kong, building engineers can become member of The Hong Kong Institution of Engineers (registered under building discipline). They can also registered at Engineers Registration Board after they have chartered and become Registered Professional Engineer (Building).

=== Nigeria ===
In Nigeria, a building engineer is simply known as builder. A builder is an academic trained specialist statutory registered professional responsible for Building Production, Management, Construction and Maintenance of Building for the use and protection of mankind. A builder must be a member of Nigeria institute of building(NIOB) and Council of Registered Builders of Nigeria(CORBON).

The major consultancy services rendered by building engineers are listed below:

- Building production management
- Building maintenance management
- Project management
- Building surveying
- Feasibility and viability studies
- Facilities monitoring and evaluation
- Arbitration, meditation and expert witness.

Functions of building engineers in the building code before plan approval according to the National Building Code:

- Contract Drawing and specification prepared by registered architects anđ registered engineers;
- Priced bill of Quantities prepared by registered quantity surveyors;
- Construction programme, project quality management plan, project health and safety plan and Buildability and maintenance analysis prepared by a registered Builder;
- Conditions of contract.
- All-risk insurance for the building works, personnel and equipment.

=== United Kingdom and Ireland ===
In the United Kingdom and Ireland, the title of "building engineer" is regulated by the CABE (Chartered Association of Building Engineers). The 'Chartered Association of Building Engineers' was founded as the 'Incorporated Association of Architects and Surveyors' (IAAS) in 1925 in London. The Incorporated Association of Architects and Surveyors became the 'Association of Building Engineers' (ABE) in 1993 and on obtaining its Royal Charter, became the 'Chartered Association of Building Engineers' (CABE) in 2014, its current name.

The CABE accredits university qualifications to use the title Chartered Building Engineer. In the United Kingdom and Ireland, Chartered Building Engineers are involved within the design, planning, engineering, construction, legal compliance, fire safety, and maintenance of buildings. Their roles may vary from one practice to another. Building Engineers may offer specialised services within phases of the construction process or for different engineering aspects of the construction industry, such as fire safety, conservation, sustainability, planning or construction.

In England and Wales, 'Building Engineers' may also be state authorised "Approved Inspectors" (or are employed by a state authorised "Corporate Approved Inspector") and thus may provide UK "Building Regulations" compliance & approval.

Many 'Building Engineers' are employed by Scottish, English and Welsh local authorities to enforce and apply the Building Regulations and other Building Act 1984 related functions, including public safety in respect of "Dangerous Structures", etc.

In the Republic of Ireland, where a semi-public building control system was implemented in 2014, Chartered Building Engineers may register as Building Surveyors in order to act as certifiers for compliance with building regulations at design and construction stage.

The tasks and duties of the building engineer are:

- Design and preparation of plans
- Preparation of planning applications
- Remedial works
- Dilapidation schedules / negotiations
- Site inspections and certification of works
- Repair and maintenance of buildings
- Energy auditing and energy performance certificates
- Measured survey of land and buildings
- Advice on energy-saving designs
- Access audits
- Rehabilitation of properties
- Conservation
- Construction management
- Quantity surveying
- Fire safety and health and safety
- Demolition
- Negotiating, obtaining and implementing claims and grants
- Building variations
- Building inspections and surveys
- Advice on building law/party wall issues
- Checking building designs for compliance with the 'Building Regulations' and related 'Building' & 'Fire' Legislation.
- Enforcement of breaches of the 'Building Regulations' and related 'Building' & 'Fire' Legislation, including 'law court' proceedings.

=== United States ===
In the United States of America building engineering, also known as Architectural engineering, is the application of engineering principles and technology to building design and construction. Definitions of an architectural engineer may refer to:

- An engineer in the structural, mechanical, electrical, construction or other engineering fields of building design and construction.
- A licensed engineering professional in parts of the United States.
- Architectural engineers are those who work with other engineers and architects for the designing and construction of buildings.

The architectural engineer applies the knowledge and skills of broader engineering disciplines to the design, construction, operation, maintenance, and renovation of buildings and their component systems while paying careful attention to their effects on the surrounding environment.

With the establishment of a specific "Architectural Engineering" NCEES Professional Engineering registration examination in the 1990s, and first offering in April 2003, Architectural Engineering is now recognized as a distinct engineering discipline in the United States.

== See also ==
- Architect
- Architectural engineering
- Architectural technologist
- Building services engineering
- Civil engineer
- Engineer
- List of construction occupations
- Structural engineer
