= B2W Software =

American software company

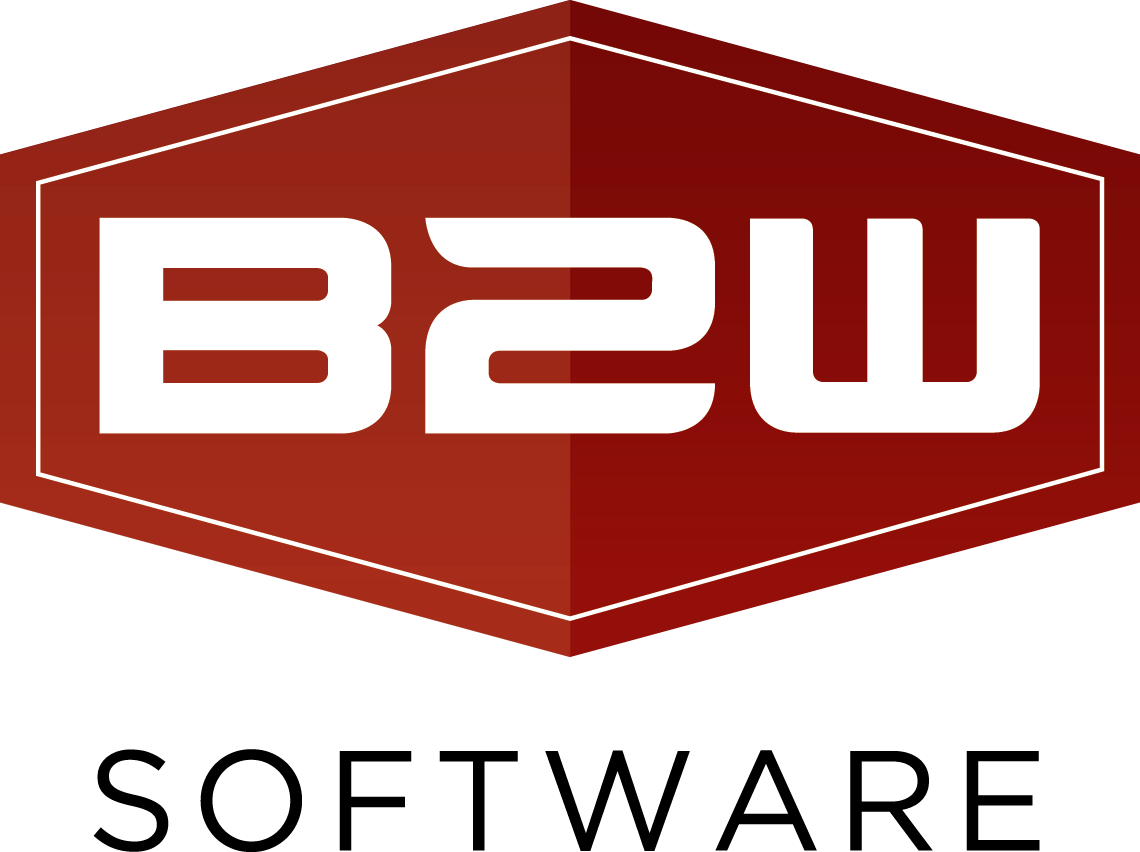
- Formerly: Niche Software; Bid2Win Software
- Type: Public - a Trimble company
- Industry: Enterprise-class construction software
- Founded: 1993; 33 years ago
- Headquarters: Portsmouth, New Hampshire, United States
- Key people: Robert Brown - general manager, Jeff Russell - VP of sales
- Products: B2W Estimate; B2W Schedule; B2W Track; B2W Employee App; B2W Maintain; B2W Inform; B2W Platform
- Owner: Trimble Inc. (2022–present)
- Website: www.b2wsoftware.com

B2W Software (formerly known as Bid2Win Software) is based in Portsmouth, New Hampshire, and develops specialized software for heavy construction contractors to manage construction estimating and bidding, field tracking and analysis, equipment maintenance, resource scheduling and dispatching and eForms and reporting.

Founded in 1993 under the name Niche Software, the company was first started with an estimating and bidding software program for the construction industry. It rebranded once more in January 2013, going from Bid2Win Software to B2W Software.

The B2W Software Platform includes individual modules, or elements - B2W Estimate (estimating & bidding), B2W Track (field tracking & analysis), released in January 2008, B2W Schedule (resource scheduling & dispatching), released in 2018, B2W Maintain (equipment maintenance & repair management), which was released in 2013, and B2W Inform (eForms and reporting).

On September 14, 2022, B2W was acquired by Trimble Inc.
