= Steel fixer =

Job category

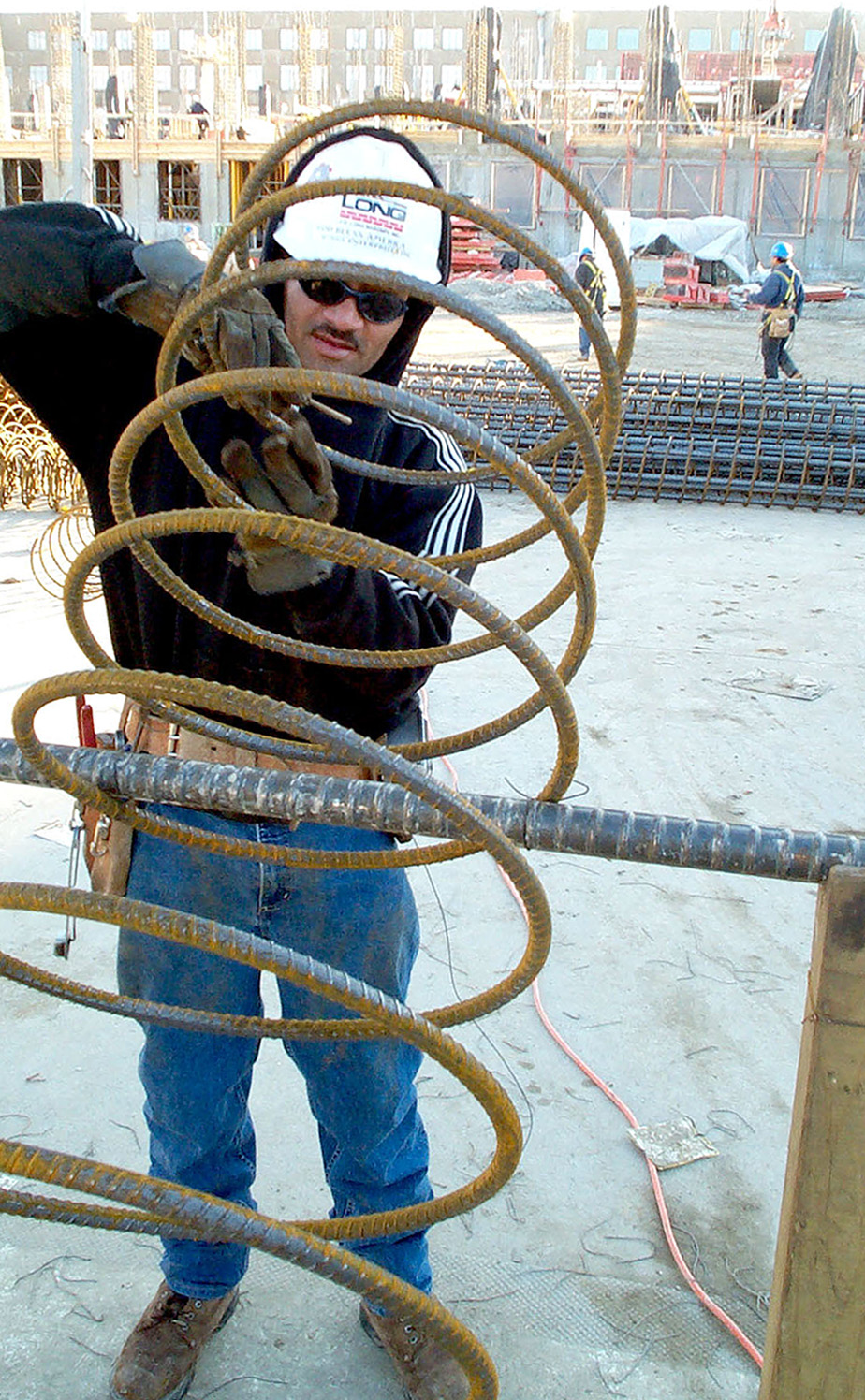
A steel fixer with column reinforcement steel

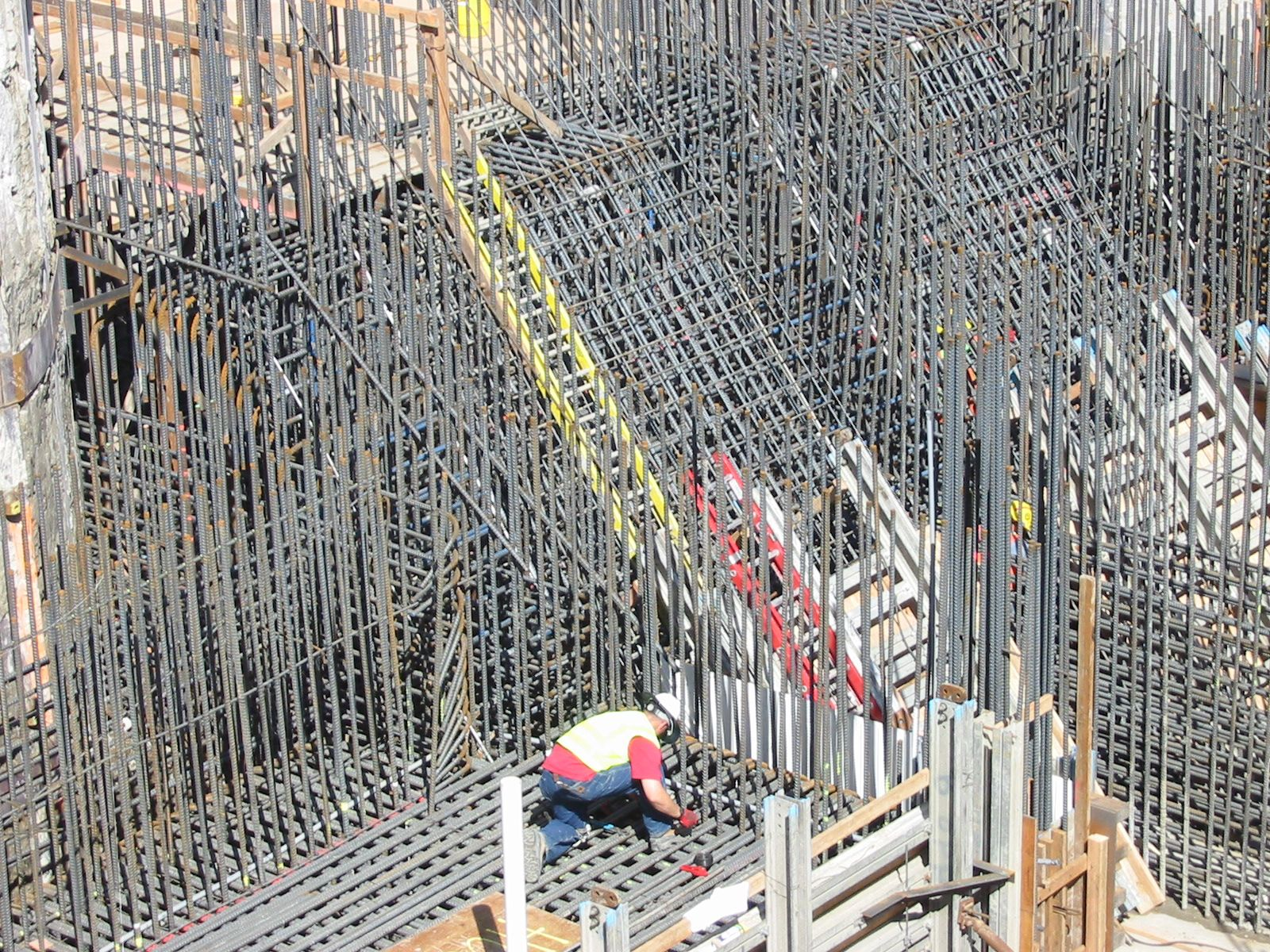
Fixing reinforcement for foundations and walls of sewage pump station in Sacramento, California

A steel fixer (UK, ironworker or "rod buster" in the United States) is a tradesman who positions and secures steel reinforcing bars, also known as rebar, and steel mesh used in reinforced concrete on construction projects.

The work involves following engineering drawings that detail the type of bar and the spacing used and setting out the work. The reinforcing bars are tied together with wire, which is cut using nips, or electric rebar tiers. Steel fixers are also responsible for attaching "spacers" and "chairs" that determine the amount of concrete cover.

== See also ==
- Apprenticeship
- Construction worker
- Vocational training
