= Pipelayer =

Skilled tradesperson

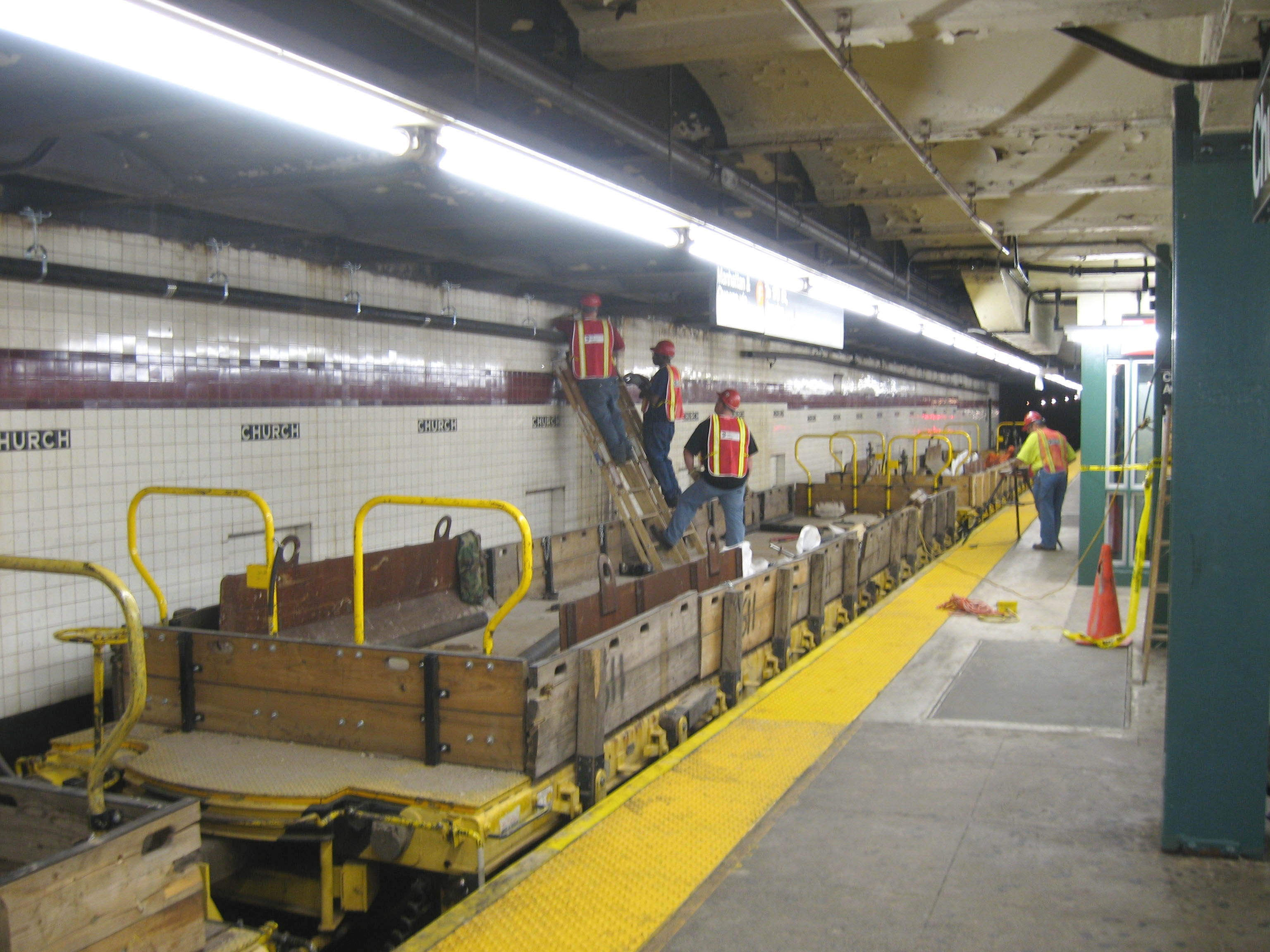
Pipelayers hanging a pipe on the wall of the Church Avenue station of the New York City Subway

A pipelayer (or pipe-layer or drain layer) is a skilled tradesman who lays pipe, such as for storm sewers, sanitary sewers, drains, and water mains. Pipelayers may grade (i.e., level) trenches and culverts, position pipe, or seal joints. The Standard Occupational Classification System code for pipelayers is 47-2151.

The Bureau of Labor Statistics of the United States Department of Labor estimated that there were 41,080 pipelayers in the United States in May 2014, earning a median hourly wage of $17.38 and a median annual wage of $37,000. (The BLS definition of pipelayer excludes welders, cutters, solderers, and brazers). Pipelayers most commonly work in the utility system construction, building construction, and highway, street, and bridge construction sectors. Among U.S. states, Alabama and North Dakota have the highest concentration of pipelaying jobs.

Pipelayers should not be confused with pipefitters. Both trades involve pipe and valves and both use some of the same tools. However, pipelayers usually work outside, laying pipe underground or on the seabed, while pipefitters typically work inside, installing piping in buildings or ships. One author summarizes the different tasks this way:

Pipe layers operate the backhoes and trenching machinery that dig the trenches to accommodate the placement of sanitary sewer pipes and stormwater sewer drainpipes. They use surveyor’s equipment to ensure the trenches have the proper slope and install the pieces of pipe in the trenches, joining the ends with cement, glue or welding equipment. Using an always-open or always-closed valve called a tap, pipe layers connect them to a wider system and bury the pipes.

Pipe fitters plan and test piping and tubing layouts, cut, bend or fabricate pipe or tubing segments and join those segments by threading them, using lead joints, welding, brazing, cementing or soldering them together. They install manual, pneumatic, hydraulic and electric valves in pipes to control the flow through the pipes or tubes. These workers create the system of tubes in boilers and make holes in walls and bulkheads to accommodate the passage of the pipes they install.

== See also ==
- Pipe-laying ship
