= Sprinkler fitting =

Fire sprinkler control valve assembly.

Sprinkler fitting is a skilled trade that consists of assembling, installing, testing, repairing, inspecting, and certifying automatic fire suppression systems and their associated piping in commercial, industrial and residential buildings.

Sprinkler systems installed by sprinkler fitters can include the underground supply as well as integrated overhead piping systems and standpipes. The fire suppression piping may contain water, air (in a dry system), antifreeze, gas or chemicals as in a hood system, or a mixture producing fire retardant foam. Sprinkler fitters work with a variety of pipe and tubing materials including several types of plastic, copper, steel, cast iron, and ductile iron.

== Standards ==
Many countries have standards or strict guidelines pertaining to the installation and maintenance of fire sprinkler systems.

=== United States ===
In the US, fire protection systems must adhere to the standards set forth in the installation standards of NFPA 13, (NFPA) 13D,(NFPA) 13R, (NFPA 14) and (NFPA) 25 which are administered, copyrighted, and published by the National Fire Protection Association.

=== United Kingdom ===
In the United Kingdom, insurers and building control authorities require that fire sprinkler systems are installed according to BS EN 12845 for commercial and industrial buildings, and BS 9251 for domestic and residential buildings.

== See also ==
- Active fire protection
- Automatic fire suppression
- Fire sprinkler system
- Piping and plumbing fitting
