= Tower climber =

Professional who works on cell and radio towers

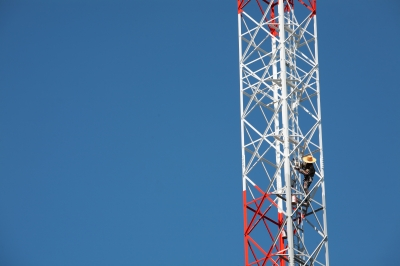
A tower climber

A tower climber specializes in maintenance, installation, and decommissioning of cellular and radio tower components such as coaxial cable, antennas, radios, fiber-optic cable and broadcast equipment for cell phones, television, radio, etc.

== Description ==
Tower climbers perform routine inspections and tests on broadcasting towers, and may also be called upon to perform repairs and to provide input when plans for new equipment are being developed.

Along with the installers of the tower antennas, other crews climb the towers to perform condition checks of the towers, guy lines and lighting systems. One of the most demanding aspects of many tower climber jobs is hauling materials and tools up to the proper installation height on the tower. In most cases, the climber scales the tower to the desired height and lowers a rope to a ground crew member who then ties it to a needed part on the ground. The tower worker then pulls the piece up and secures the rope before installing the part onto the tower.

== Hazards ==
Tower climbers may be injured or killed by falling objects, structural collapses and equipment failures. Some of the more frequently encountered hazards include falls from great heights; electrical hazards; hazards associated with hoisting personnel and equipment with base-mounted drum hoists; inclement weather; and structural collapse of towers.

=== United States ===
In 2008 it was reported that working on cellphone towers is the deadliest job in the United States, according to a trade publication, and in 2012 it was claimed that the tower climbing industry experiences 10 times more death casualties than construction workers. There were 50–100 deaths from falls from communication towers between 2003 and 2011. In 2008, the head of the Occupational Safety and Health Administration (OSHA) called tower climbing “the most dangerous job in America.”
