= Framer =

Someone who frames

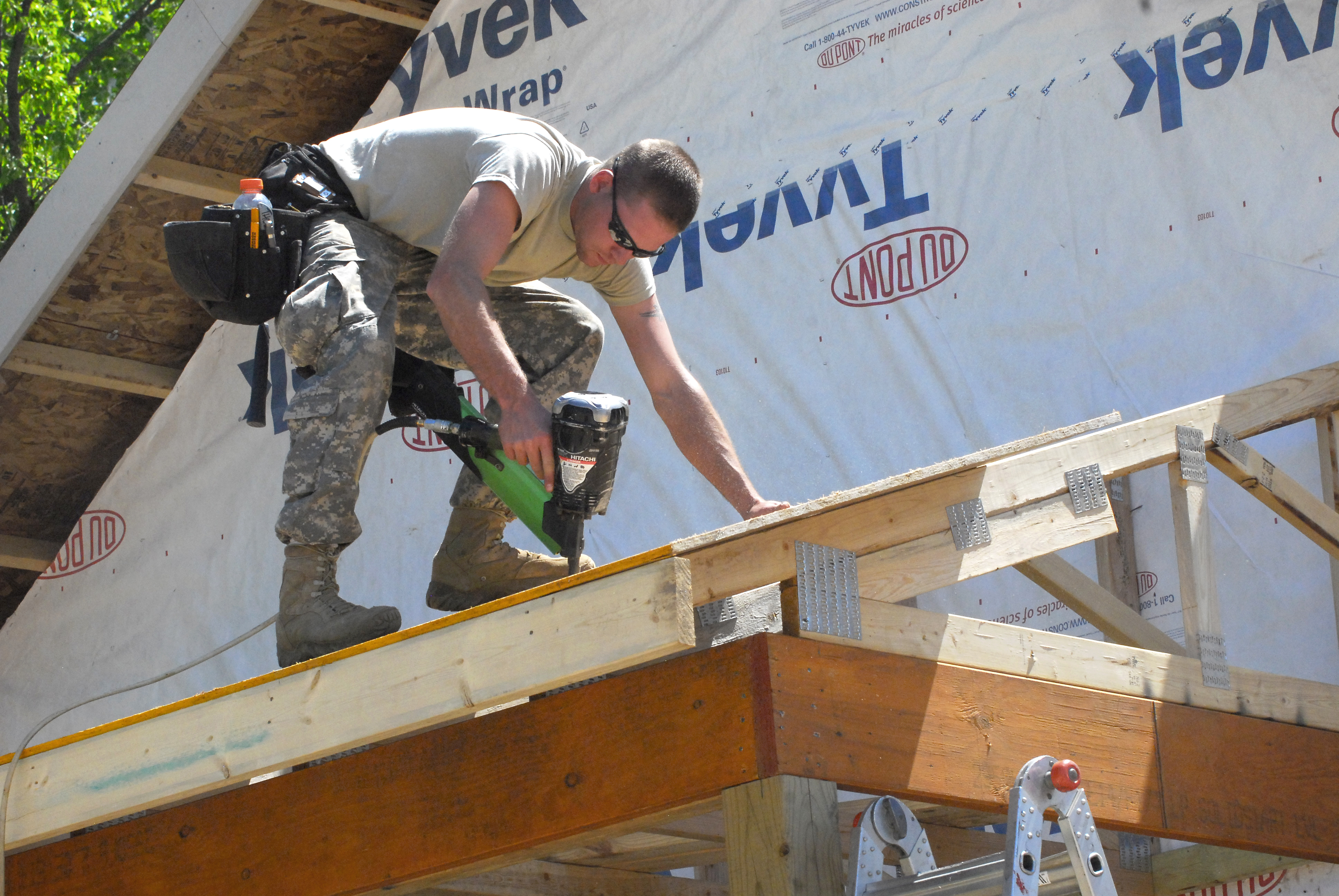
A US Army framer in the United States nailing the roof decking to prefabricated trusses using a nail gun. His tool belt and safety glasses are typical, but hearing protection and fall arrest equipment are missing.

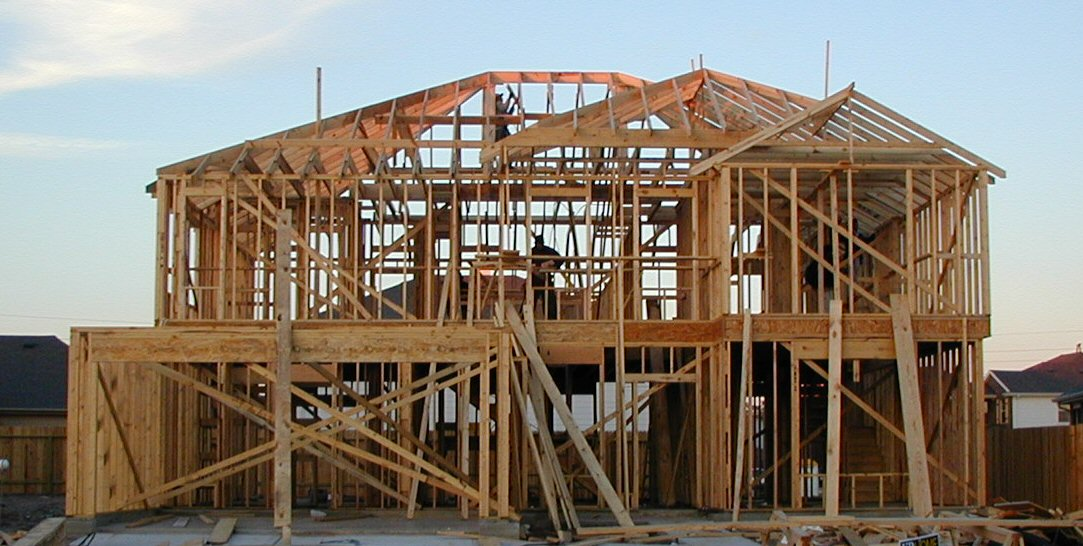
Modern framers in the United States specialize in erecting wood structures using the platform framing method

A framer is someone who builds or creates frames. In construction work, frames may be built from wood or metal and provide support and shape to a structure. In a related sense, framers may create frames for art works, pictures, or mirrors. The term framer is also used for the authors of a formal text such as a constitution.

== Woodworking ==
=== Building industry ===
In building construction a framer is a carpenter who assembles the major structural elements of a wood-framed building called the framing. Framers build walls out of studs, sills, and headers; build floors from joists, beams, and trusses; and frame roofs using ridge poles and rafters or trusses. Platform framing is the most common method of construction.

=== Timber framing ===
Timber framers are framers who work in the traditional style of timber framing, historically with wooden joinery. Timber framing is a type of light framing in which wood (as the building structure) and drywall framing are used.

=== Traditional chair making industry ===
Modern craftsman assembling a Windsor style sofa

In the traditional chair making industry, it was the bodger who produced the turned parts of a chair and the benchman who produced the splats, side rails and other sawn parts. However it was the framer who assembled and finished the chair with the parts supplied by the bodger and benchman.

== Art ==
=== Picture framer ===
A picture framer is the person who builds picture frames for artwork and photographs. The first carved wooden frames as we know them today appeared on small panel paintings in twelfth and thirteenth century Europe. Framed panel paintings were made from one piece. The area to be painted was carved out, leaving a raised framing border around the outside edge, like a tray. The whole piece was then gessoed and gilded. Painting the image on the flat panel was the last thing to be done. Eventually, a more efficient method was developed which used mitred moulding strips. These strips were attached to a flat wooden panel which produced a similar result to the carved panel, but was more cost effective. The modern picture framer can use a variety of materials for the frame, but essentially the framing technique remains the same.

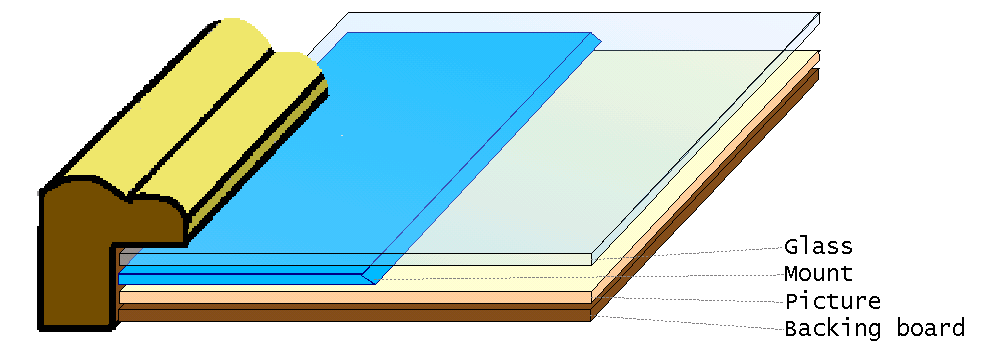
Components used in a typical picture frame.

== Written text ==
A framer can be the creator, inventor or author of a formal text such as a law or constitution.

A framer can also be a language translator who is responsible for producing the translated text.
