= Elevator mechanic =

Profession

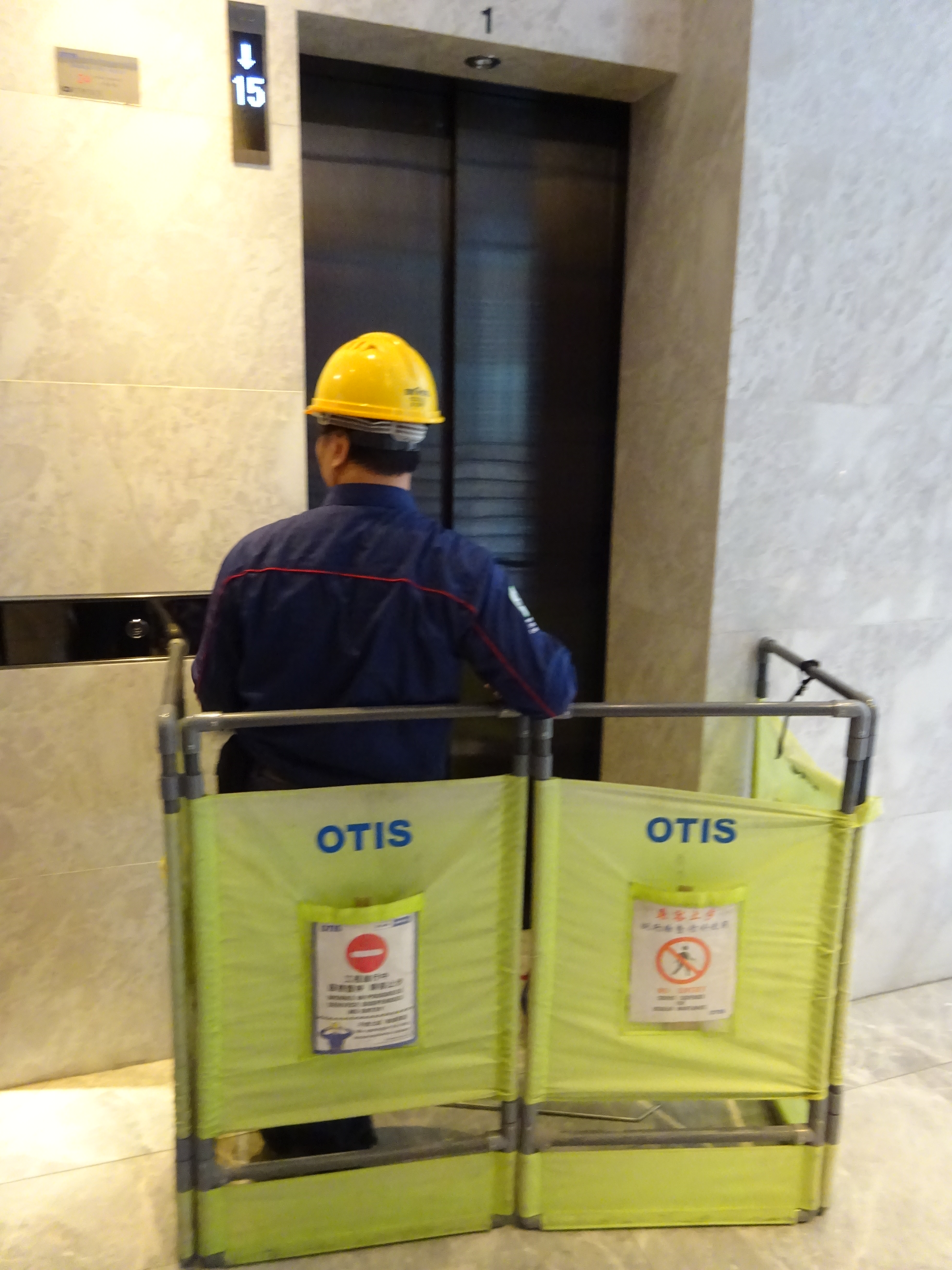
An elevator mechanic in Hong Kong

An elevator mechanic, also called an elevator constructor or elevator technician, is a skilled tradesperson who constructs, modernizes, repairs, or services conveyances. Elevator mechanics work on elevators, escalators, dumbwaiters, wheelchair lifts, moving walkways, and other equipment providing vertical transportation.

== Training and career prospects ==
Labor unions have a large impact on the industry, depending on the country. For example, in the United States and Canada, many elevator mechanics belong to the International Union of Elevator Constructors. Elevator mechanics go through formal apprenticeships, often through trade schools associated with unions. Most US states require a license.

Mechanics in the United States make an average annual wage of US$109,910 as of 2025. It is one of the highest paying occupations that does not require a college degree. Elevator mechanic jobs are expected to grow 6% in the U.S. from 2025 to 2035. In San Francisco and New York City, where many elevators may be 100 years old or older, elevator technicians with expertise in antiquated systems are in high demand.

== Work environment ==
Elevator installer working in a Long Island Rail Road station under construction

Elevator installers are usually required to lift and carry heavy parts and equipment. They are also often required to work overtime due to demand for quick repairs and emergencies. Elevators can stop working at any time, therefore many workers are on call 24 hours a day. The work involves risk to personal safety and is physically difficult, due to working with heavy equipment, high-voltage electricity, and confined spaces.

Elevator installers may work on elevators in a wide range of structures in addition to residential and commercial buildings, such as missile silos, deep shaft coal mines, and dams.
