= Concrete finisher =

Tradesperson

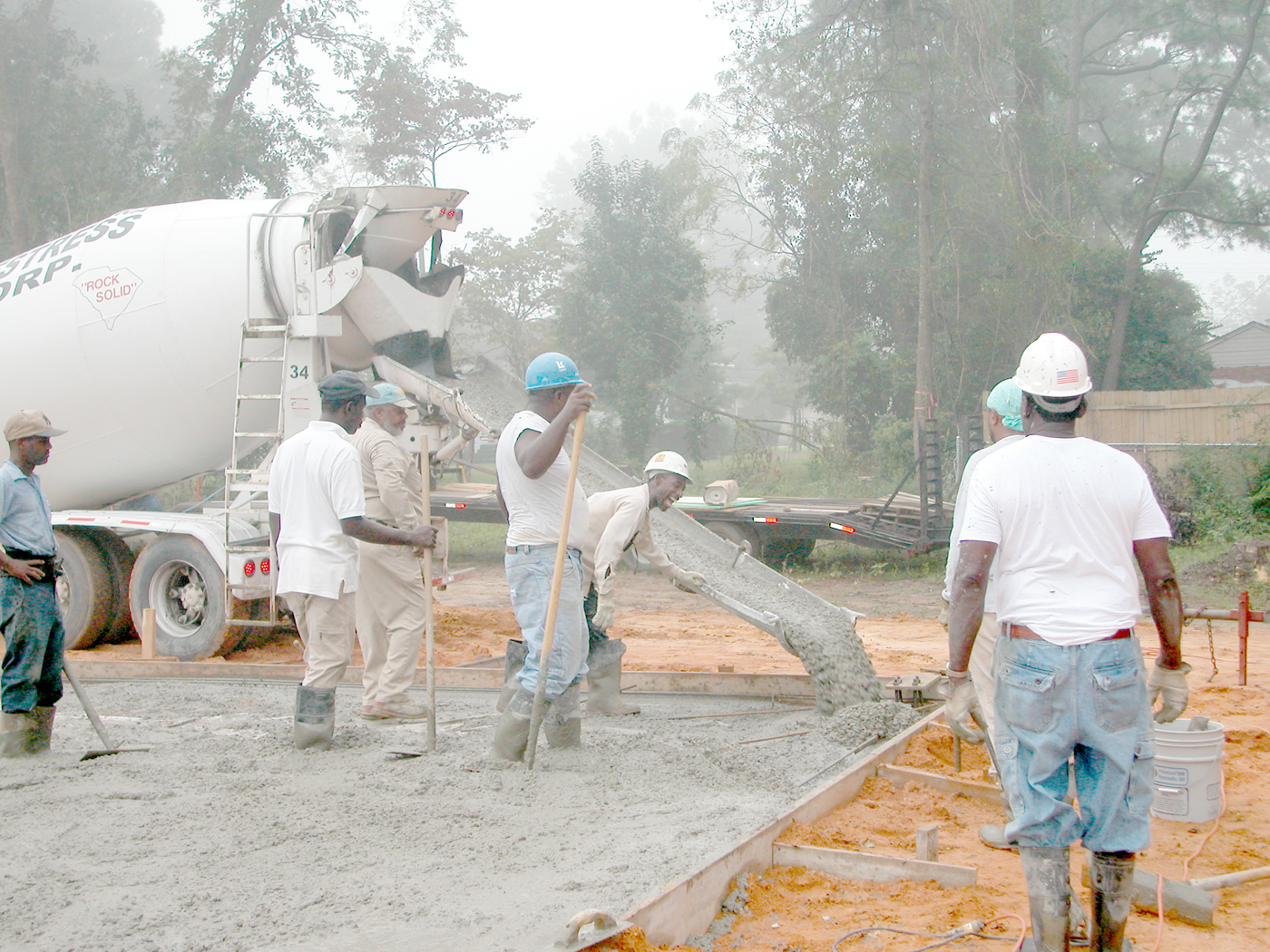
Pouring a slab-on-grade foundation

A concrete finisher is a skilled tradesperson who works with concrete by placing, finishing, protecting and repairing concrete in engineering and construction projects. Concrete finishers are often responsible for setting the concrete forms, ensuring they have the correct depth and pitch.

Concrete finishers place the concrete either directly from the concrete wagon chute, concrete pump, concrete skip or wheelbarrow. They spread the concrete using shovels and rakes, sometimes using a straightedge back and forth across the top of the forms to screed or level the freshly placed concrete. After levelling the concrete, they smooth the surface using either a hand trowel, a long handed bull float or by using powered floats. After the concrete has been leveled and floated, concrete finishers press an edger between the forms and the concrete to chamfer the edges so that they are less likely to chip.

Broom and stamp finishes are a couple of different finished products for outdoor concrete after the trowel-finish is complete. The broom finish is used to prevent slipping on the concrete, and the stamp finish is used for looks.

== See also ==
- Concrete
- Construction
- Operative Plasterers' and Cement Masons' International Association
- American Concrete Institute
