= Banksman =

Civil engineering profession

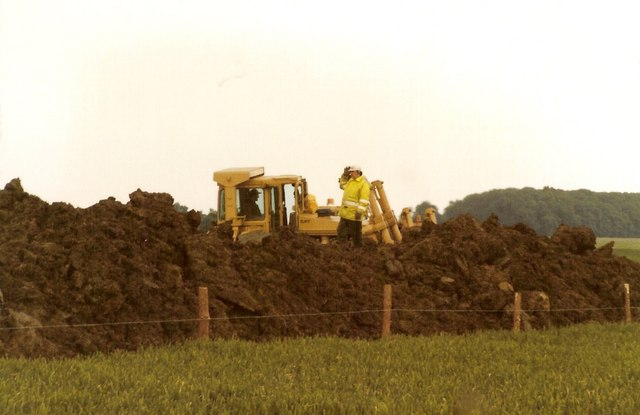
A banksman in a hi-vis jacket, directing bulldozer operators from the top of a spoil heap

In Irish and British civil engineering, a banksman is the person who directs the operation of a crane or larger vehicle from the point near where loads are attached and detached. The term dogman may be used in Australia, in New Zealand dogman is used for trained personnel and spotter for untrained, while spotter is the more common term in United States.

== Offshore oil and gas ==
The general term for a professional banksman offshore is a rigger or deck crew. A team of riggers will manage lifting operations. There are specific methods, pieces of equipment, and safety protocol for many different types of loads. Offshore, on rigs or vessels, most equipment and materials will arrive on location, transferred by boat utilising a crane, therefore banksmen play an important role in the marine and offshore industries.

== Contemporary ==
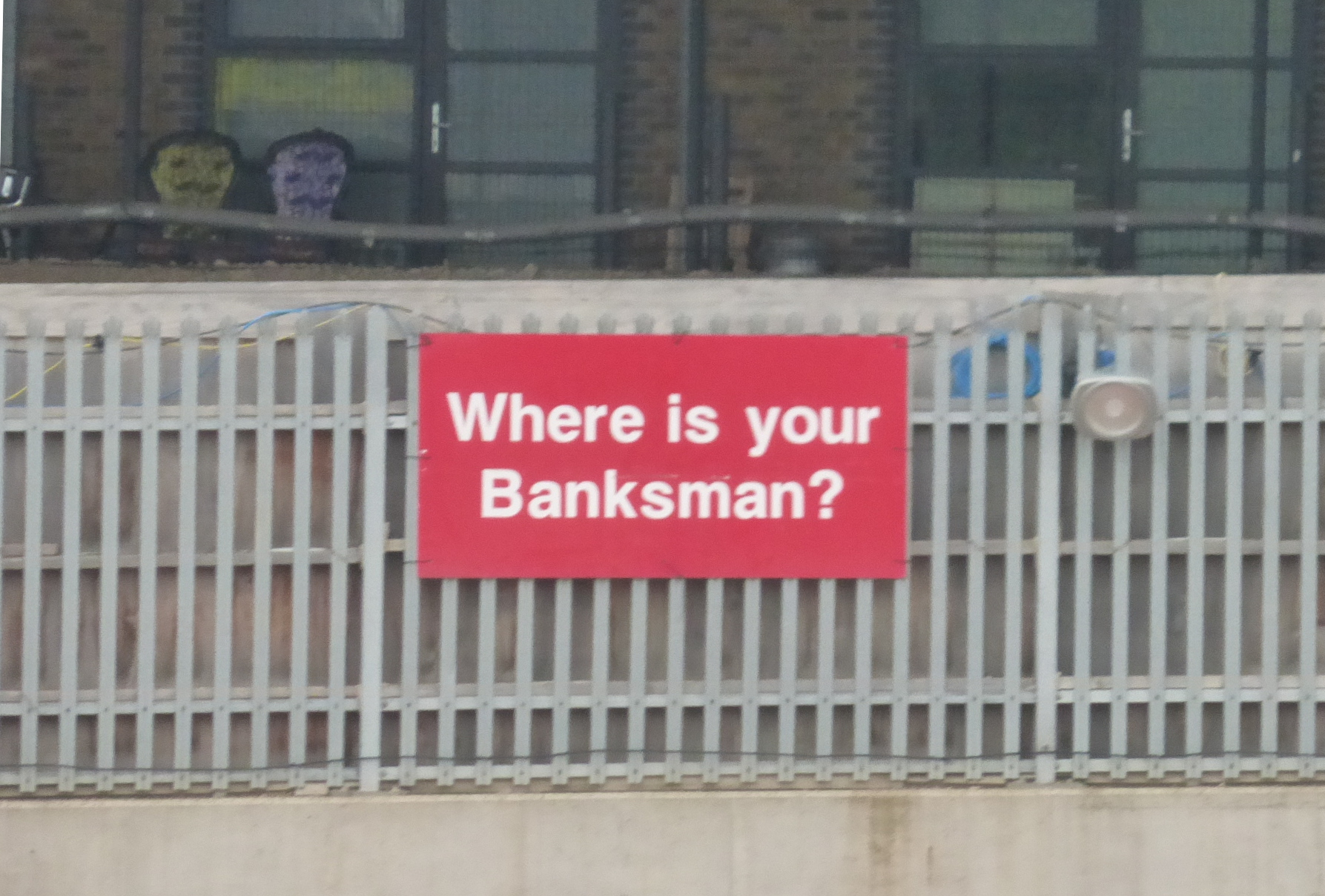
A safety reminder displayed at an industrial site near London Paddington station.

Crane or large vehicle drivers do not always have clear visibility of the loading area, especially when tower cranes are employed. The banksman is in charge of the crane movements from the point of loading and unloading. They may use a system of hand signals or a radio link.

A banksman may also be responsible for directing the movement and loading/unloading of lorries, or directing the movement of other plant. A banksman may also control the movements of an excavator, by carefully monitoring the bucket for any obstructions or underground services.

In many countries, banksmen are required to meet a regulated standard, such as laid down by the UK's Health and Safety Executive; in the UK over a quarter of vehicle deaths at work are due to reversing vehicles.

== Usage timeline ==
- 1825: the man stationed at the bank or top of a pit who unhooked and emptied the laden corves into carts or wagons, from a frame or stage.
- 1849: the man who drew the full tubs from the cages at the surface, when wound up by the engine, and replaced them with empty ones; he also put the full tubs to the weighing machine, and thence to the skreens, upon which he teemed the coals. It was also his duty to keep an account of the quantity of coals and stones drawn each day.
- 1894: a person who controlled the unloading and loading of the cage at the pit top, and signalled the descent of the workmen.
