= Construction management =

Professional service

Construction Management (CM) is a professional service that applies project management techniques to the planning, design, and construction of a project, from its beginning to its completion. The goal of CM is to control a project's scope, time, cost, and quality (sometimes called the project management triangle or "triple constraints") to achieve the owner’s objectives.

Practitioners of construction management are called construction managers. They combine knowledge of building science and business management to coordinate and deliver capital projects such as commercial real estate, transportation infrastructure, and military infrastructure. Professional services firms in North America and Europe increasingly provide CM alongside related specialties such as critical path method (CPM) scheduling, delay analysis, and expert witness testimony for construction disputes.

== Overview ==
Construction management focuses on integrating cost, schedule, quality, safety, and scope throughout the project lifecycle. Unlike a general contractor, a CM firm or professional may be engaged as an owner’s representative to advise during feasibility, design, procurement, and construction.

== Roles and responsibilities ==
A construction manager’s responsibilities typically include:

- Planning and scheduling
- Budgeting and cost control
- Contract administration
- Quality and safety management
- Communication and stakeholder coordination
- Documentation and claims management

According to the Construction Management Association of America (CMAA), the seven common categories of responsibility are: Project Management Planning, Cost Management, Time Management, Quality Management, Contract Administration, Safety Management, and CM Professional Practice.

== Functions ==
Core functions of construction management include:

1. Specifying project objectives and plans, including scope, budgeting, scheduling, performance requirements, and selecting participants
2. Maximizing resource efficiency through procurement of labor, materials, and equipment
3. Coordinating design, estimating, contracting, and construction
4. Establishing communication systems and conflict-resolution mechanisms

== Procurement ==
=== Bids ===
- Open bid: Any contractor can submit a bid (common in public projects).
- Closed bid: Only invited contractors can submit (common in private projects).

=== Selection methods ===
- Low-bid selection: Chooses the lowest price.
- Best-value selection: Considers price and qualifications.
- Qualifications-based selection: Considers qualifications only. Often used in early design stages.

=== Contract types ===
- Lump sum – Fixed price for project delivery
- Cost plus fee – Owner pays cost plus a fee/percentage
- Guaranteed maximum price – Cost-plus contract with a cap
- Unit price – Used when scope is uncertain, priced per unit

== Project stages ==
- Feasibility and design – Programming, schematic design, design development, contract documents
- Pre-construction – Assigning the project team, site investigation, permitting
- Procurement – Hiring subcontractors and purchasing materials
- Construction – On-site work, progress payments, quality control
- Owner occupancy – Warranty period and closeout

== Common issues ==
- Dust and mud control
- Environmental protection (stormwater, endangered species, vegetation, wetlands, cultural artifacts)

== Documentation ==
Project documentation may include diaries, logs, and daily field reports. These records are important for dispute resolution and can be used as evidence in legal proceedings.

== Dispute resolution ==
Methods include mediation, minitrial, and arbitration. Arbitration is binding and typically more costly than mediation.

== Education and practice ==
CM is taught in associate, bachelor’s, master’s, and doctoral programs. Accreditation bodies include ABET, the American Council for Construction Education (ACCE), and the Associated Schools of Construction (ASC). Programs cover management, construction methods, and law.

== Software ==
Construction and capital project management software (CPMS) help manage budgets, schedules, documents, and collaboration. Increasingly, cloud platforms allow owners, contractors, and consultants to work together in real time.

== Skills required ==
- Building science and technology
- Public safety and risk management
- Human resources and leadership
- Cost engineering and mathematics
- Communication and negotiation

== Project delivery methods ==
- Design–bid–build
- Design–build – Combines design and construction under one contract
- Turnkey contracts
- Construction management as a PDM (agency CM, CM-at-risk)
- CM at-risk, including its risks and advantages
- Accelerated construction techniques (e.g., Massachusetts DOT Fast 14 program)

== See also ==
- Civil engineering
- Construction engineering
- Cost engineering
- List of construction occupations
- Project delivery method
- Structural engineering
- Work breakdown structure
