= Tradesperson =

Skilled specialist

Tradesperson

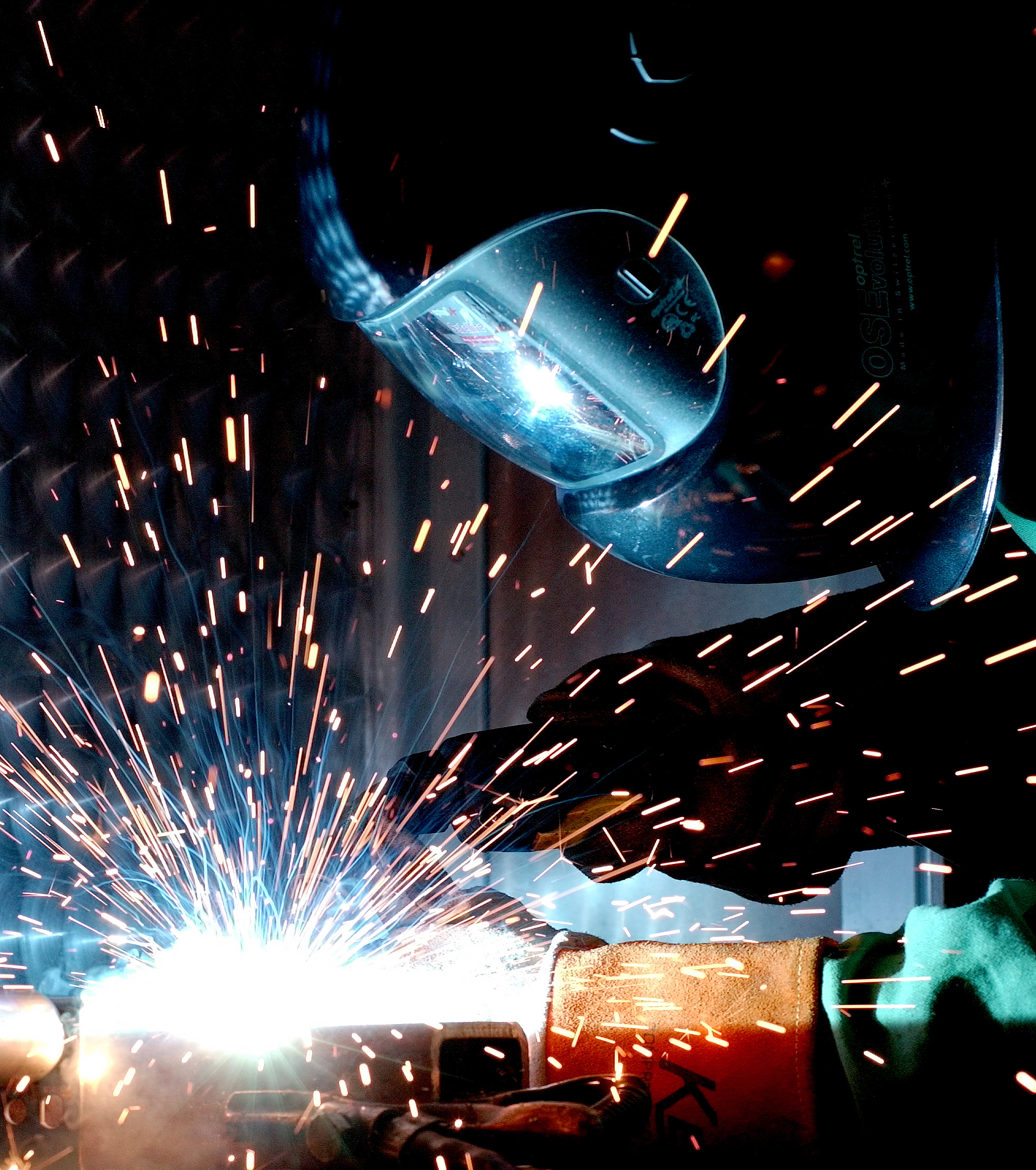
Welder

Articulated hauler and excavator heavy equipment operators

A tradesperson or tradesman/tradeswoman is a skilled worker that specialises in a particular craft or occupation. Tradespeople usually gain their skills through work experience, on-the-job training, an apprenticeship program or formal education, or some mix of these methods.

As opposed to a master craftsman or an artisan, a tradesperson is not necessarily restricted to manual work.

== History ==
In Victorian England, the terms "skilled worker," "craftsman," "artisan," and "tradesman" were used in senses that overlap. In Australia and New Zealand, the term "tradie" is commonly used.

All of these terms describe people with specialized training in the skills needed for a particular kind of work. Some of them produced goods that they sold from their own premises (e.g. bootmakers, saddlers, hatmakers, jewelers, glassblowers); others (e.g. typesetters, bookbinders, wheelwrights) were employed to do one part of the production in a business that required a variety of skilled workers. Still others were factory hands who had become experts in some complex part of the process and could command high wages and steady employment. Skilled workers in the building trades (e.g. carpenters, masons, plumbers, plasterers, glaziers, painters etc.) were also referred to by one or another of these terms.

One study of Caversham, New Zealand, at the turn of the century notes that a skilled trade was considered a trade that required an apprenticeship to entry. Skilled tradesmen worked either in traditional handicraft workshops or newer factories that emerged during the Industrial Revolution. Traditional handicraft roles included, for example: "sail-maker, candle-maker, cooper, japanner, lapidary and taxidermist, canister-maker, furrier, cap-maker, dobbin-maker, french-polisher, baker, miller, brewer, butcher, confectioner, watch-maker, tinsmith, glazier, maltster, wood-turner, saddler, shipwright, scale-maker, engraver and cutler."

== Modern use and list of skilled trades ==
Tradespeople are contrasted with laborers, workers, and professionals (those in the learned white collar professions). Skilled tradespeople are distinguished:

- from laborers such as bus drivers, truck drivers, cleaning laborers, and landscapers in that the laborers "rely heavily on physical exertion" while those in the skilled trades rely on and are known for "specific knowledge, skills, and abilities." Both types of work, however, are considered blue-collar.
- from professionals in that the professionals require more specialized education, enjoy a higher degree of occupational prestige, and have a higher duty of care and routinely make decisions "on the basis of expertise and ability in complex situations where there may be no, or little, previous history."

=== Trades list ===
- Carpentry - woodworking, framing, doors/windows, drywall, insulation, flooring, siding, finishing work, cabinetry, furniture.
- Plumbing - plumbing fixtures, piping and plumbing fitting, water heater, steamfitter, GreenPlumbers, and drain cleaner.
- Electrician - wiring, light fixture/major appliance, solar power installation, electric motor/generator technician, electronics technician, lineworker.
- Welding - MIG, TIG, stick, welding joints, welding symbols, and metalworking.
- Masonry - concrete work, bricks/blocks/stones, troweling, and tiling.
- HVAC - heating, ventilation, air conditioning, refrigeration, and duct work.
- Painting and decorating - staining, wallpaper, paint mixing, plasterwork, and spackling paste.
- Roofing - shingles, standing seam metal roof, corrugated metal roof, solar roofs, rubber shingles, rain gutters.
- Machinist - machining, lathes, milling, drilling, grinding, and CNC machining.
- Mechanic - auto mechanic/restoration/scrapping, refrigeration/air conditioning, boiler, millwright, elevator mechanic.
- Metal fabrication - machinist, lathes, milling, drilling, grinding, and CNC machining.
- Culinary chef - baker, meat cutter\fishmonger, deli, cheesemonger, sushi itamae, and cook.
- Telecommunications technician - tower technician, directional boring, fiber-optic/coaxial, utility pole technician, satellite dish installer.
- Automation technician - PLCs, instrumentation calibration, assembly/production line, industrial installation and maintenance.
- Semiconductor technician
- Tailor
- Barber
- Heavy equipment operators - excavator, front-end loader, bulldozer, grader, skid-steer, cranes, feller buncher, paver, articulated hauler/dump truck.
- CAD technician - drafter, architect, industrial design, CAD/CAM/BIM.
- Window-cleaner

== Earnings and social standing ==
A British study found that, after taking student loan repayments into account, a higher apprenticeship (at level 5 in the national qualifications frameworks) delivered higher lifetime median earnings than a degree from a university outside the Russell Group. Despite this, polling for the report found that apprenticeships have a lower perceived value than bachelor's degrees.

Data from the United States shows that vocational education can provide a respectable income at a lesser cost in time and money for training. Even ten years after graduation, there are many people with a certificate or associate degree who earn more money than those with a B.A.

== See also ==
- Artisan
- Career and Technical Education
- Grey-collar worker
- Craft guild
- Journeyman
- List of construction trades
- Master craftsman
- Renovation
- Skilled worker
- Tech ed
- Technician
- Trade union
- Vocational education
