= Construction worker =

Person employed in the construction industry

- Construction workers wearing reflective vests, hard hats, and other protective clothing at a work site in Portland, Oregon.

Occupation
- Activity sectors: Construction

Description
- Fields of employment: Construction sites
- Related jobs: Laborer

A construction worker, builder, or constructor, is a person working in the physical construction of the built environment and its infrastructure. The term is used to cover a wide range of roles and tasks during all phases of a construction project, though it typically refers to those involved in the physical labor of construction.

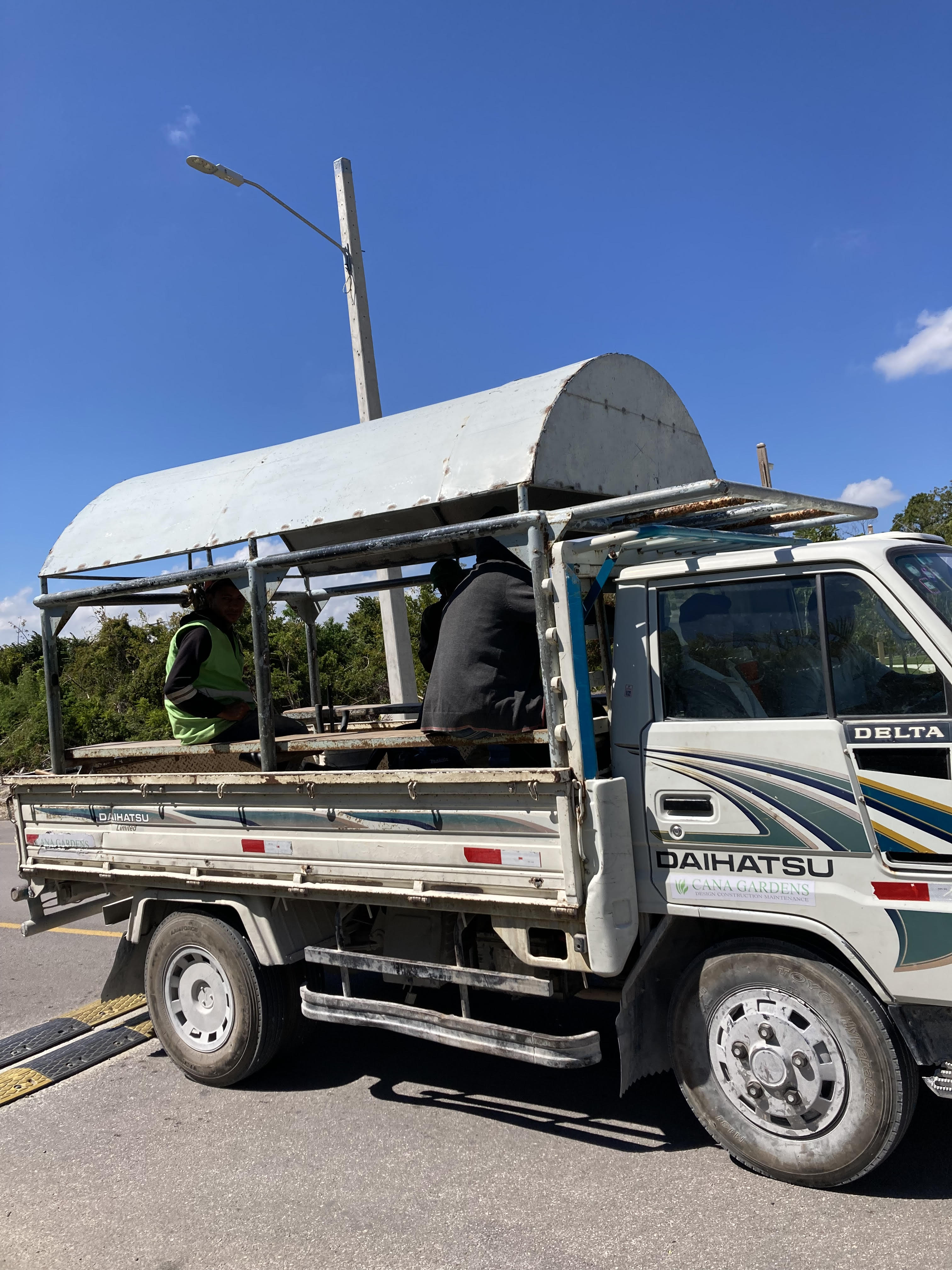
Construction workers in Punta Cana, Dominican Republic

== Definitions ==
Construction workers perform manual labour as unskilled or semi-skilled workers. Entry-level tasks such as digging, cleaning, and unloading equipment. With experience, workers can specialize in areas like roofing, concrete work, electric work, pipefitting, structural work, or carpentry. Workers may also pursue certifications and formal training to develop specialized skills and advance into skilled trades or supervisory and manferial positions.

United Kingdom safety legislation has defined construction workers as people "who work for or under the control of a contractor on a construction site." In Canada, this can include people whose work includes ensuring conformance with building codes and regulations and those who supervise other workers.

=== Demographics ===
Most construction workers are primarily described by the specific level and type of work they perform. Laborers comprise a large grouping in most national construction industries. In the United States, for example, in May 2023, construction sector businesses employed just over 7.9 million people, of whom 859,000 were laborers, while 3.7 million were construction trades workers (including 603,000 carpenters, 559,000 electricians, 385,000 plumbers, and 321,000 equipment operators). Like most business sectors, there is also substantial white-collar employment in construction. Out of 7.9 million US construction business workers, 681,000 were recorded by the United States Department of Labor in May 2023 as in 'office and administrative support occupations', 620,000 in 'management occupations' and 480,000 in 'business and financial operations occupations'. In 2023, the United States reported that, of the total number of construction workers, 27.7% of workers were Hispanic and around 6.2% were women. In some economies, there is also substantial self-employment; in the United Kingdom construction industry, for example, 1.4 million out of 2.25 million workers were classified as self-employed in 2023. In the US in 2015, unincorporated self-employment rates were highest for workers in construction and extraction occupations (14.8 percent).

Construction workers can colloquially be referred to as "hard hat workers" or "hard hats", as they often wear hard hats for safety while working on construction sites to protect against injury from falling objects.

== Safety ==
The construction industry is a high-hazard sector, encompassing alteration and repair. Workers are exposed to various serious hazards, such as falling debris, unguarded machinery, heavy equipment, electrocutions, silica dust, and asbestos. Thus, construction safety is intended to ensure a safe environment for workers, who are required to be educated on safety at each site. Construction workers must remain vigilant by keeping work areas clear, learning safe lifting techniques, being aware of seasonal hazards, and regularly inspecting all equipment, among other preventive measures.

All companies in the United States are required to comply with OSHA regulations and provide workers with appropriate safety training. OSHA inspectors may visit worksites to access compliance with workplace safety standards. Employers are also required by law to have an OSHA job safety poster.

Publications have been issued by authorities to train construction workers on safe working, e.g., when using power tools. In Hong Kong, excessive dust or noise caused by power tools, is an offense under pollution regulations. In India, the Building and Other Construction Workers Act 1996 regulates the employment and conditions of service of building and other construction workers and provides for safety, health and welfare measures. In 2020, India passed the Occupational Safety, Health and Working Conditions code, to consolidate and amend over 13 old central labour laws. The code came into force on November 21, 2025.

== Migrant construction workers ==
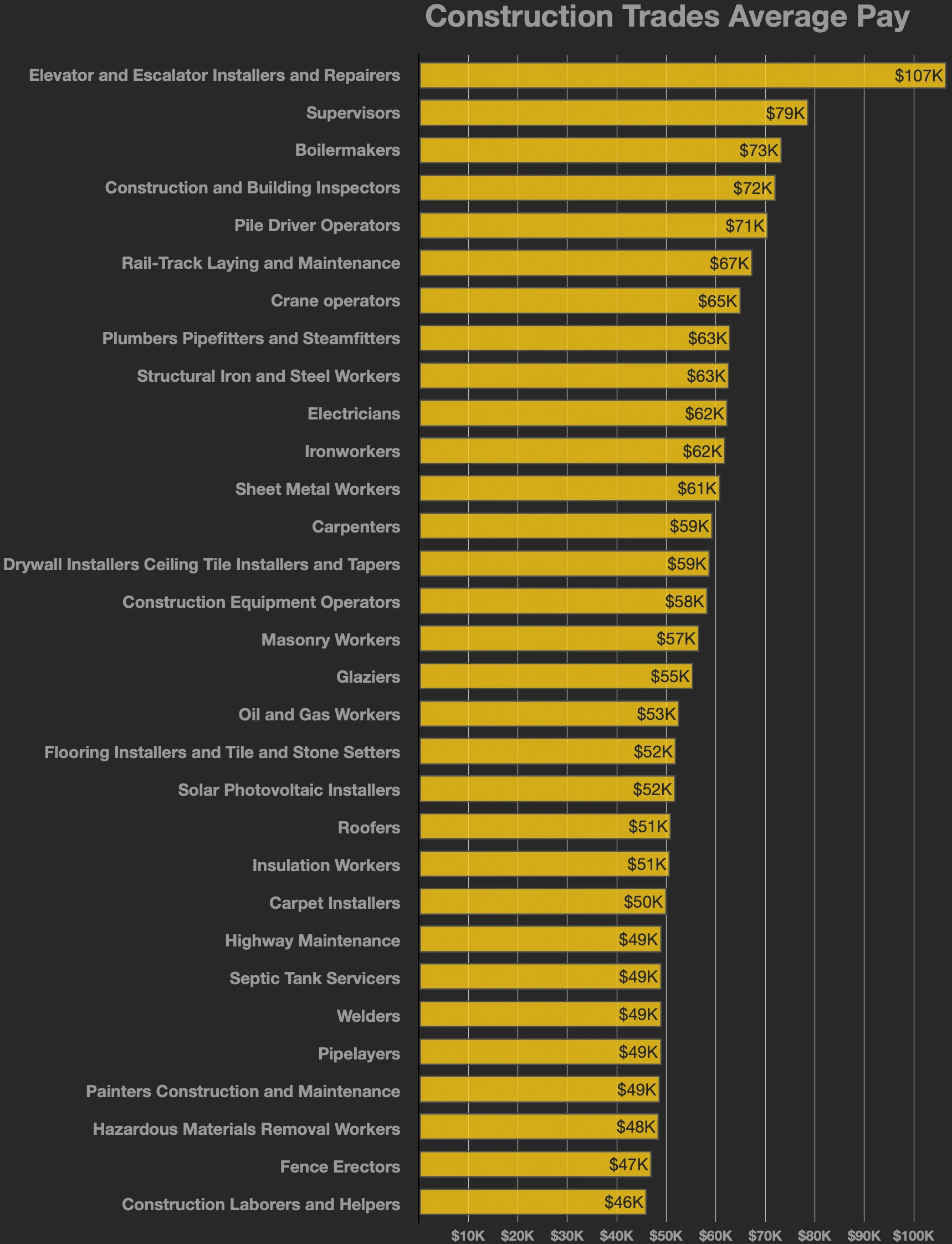
Construction trades average pay in the United States

Migrant workers tend to decrease the pay for construction workers.

In 2008, a Human Rights Watch report described unsafe and unfair working conditions in China and a failure on the part of the government to enforce labor standards in the construction industry. The International Labour Organization (ILO) estimated that, at the end of 2006, 90% of the 40 million construction workers in China were migrant workers. Many turned to work after their farming communities collapsed into poverty. In the United States, foreign workers are prevalent in some parts of the industry. Due to impunity, some employers commit crimes such as wage theft and violation of workplace standards. Similar abuse occurred in Qatar during preparations for the 2022 FIFA World Cup where workers, mostly from poor countries in the Indian subcontinent, worked in desert conditions for as little as €6.20 a day.

== See also ==
- Civil engineering
- Dirty, Dangerous and Demeaning
- Index of construction articles
- List of topics on working time and conditions
- Outline of construction
- Construction site safety
