= Lists of occupations =

The following are lists of occupations grouped by category.

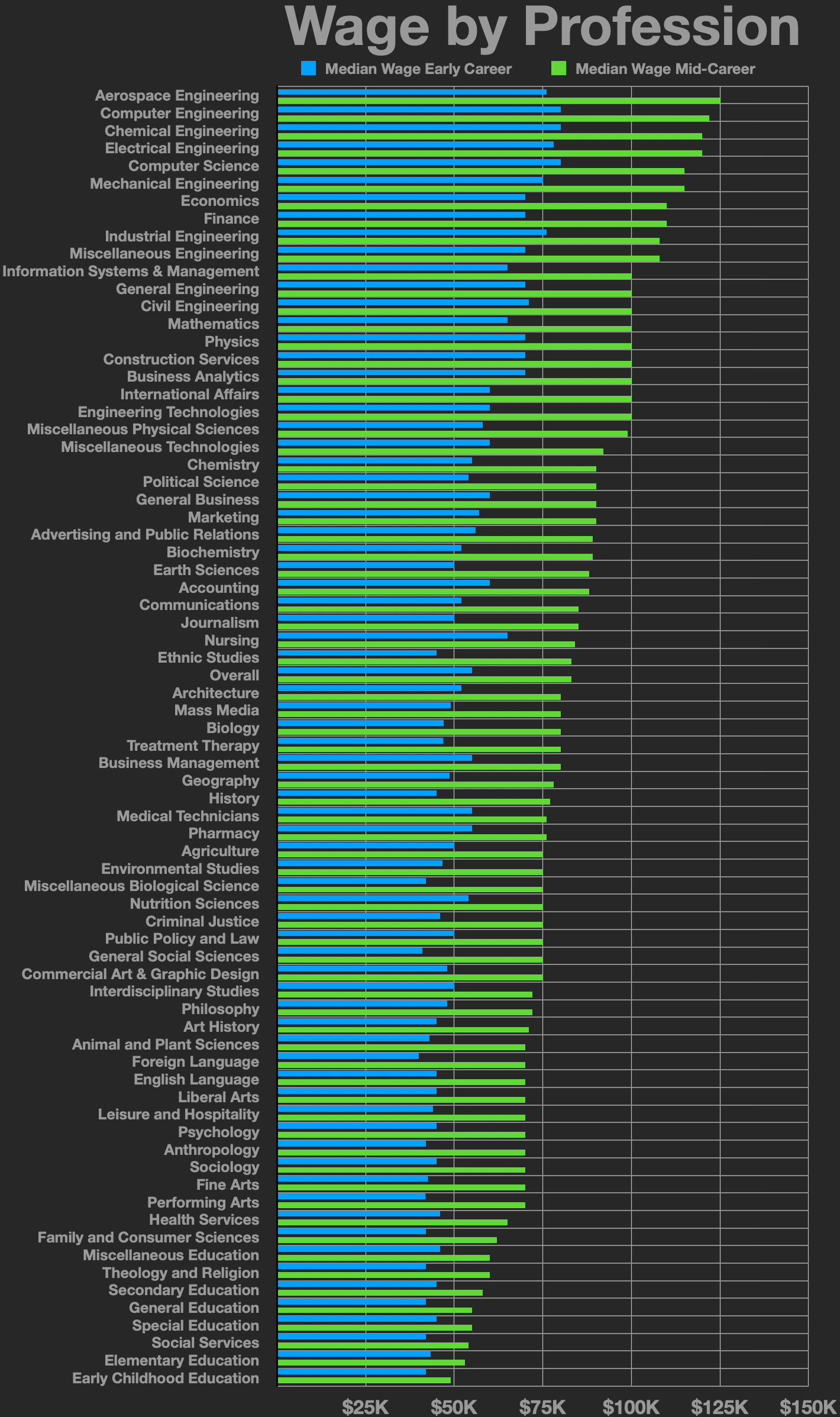
Wage by profession in the United States

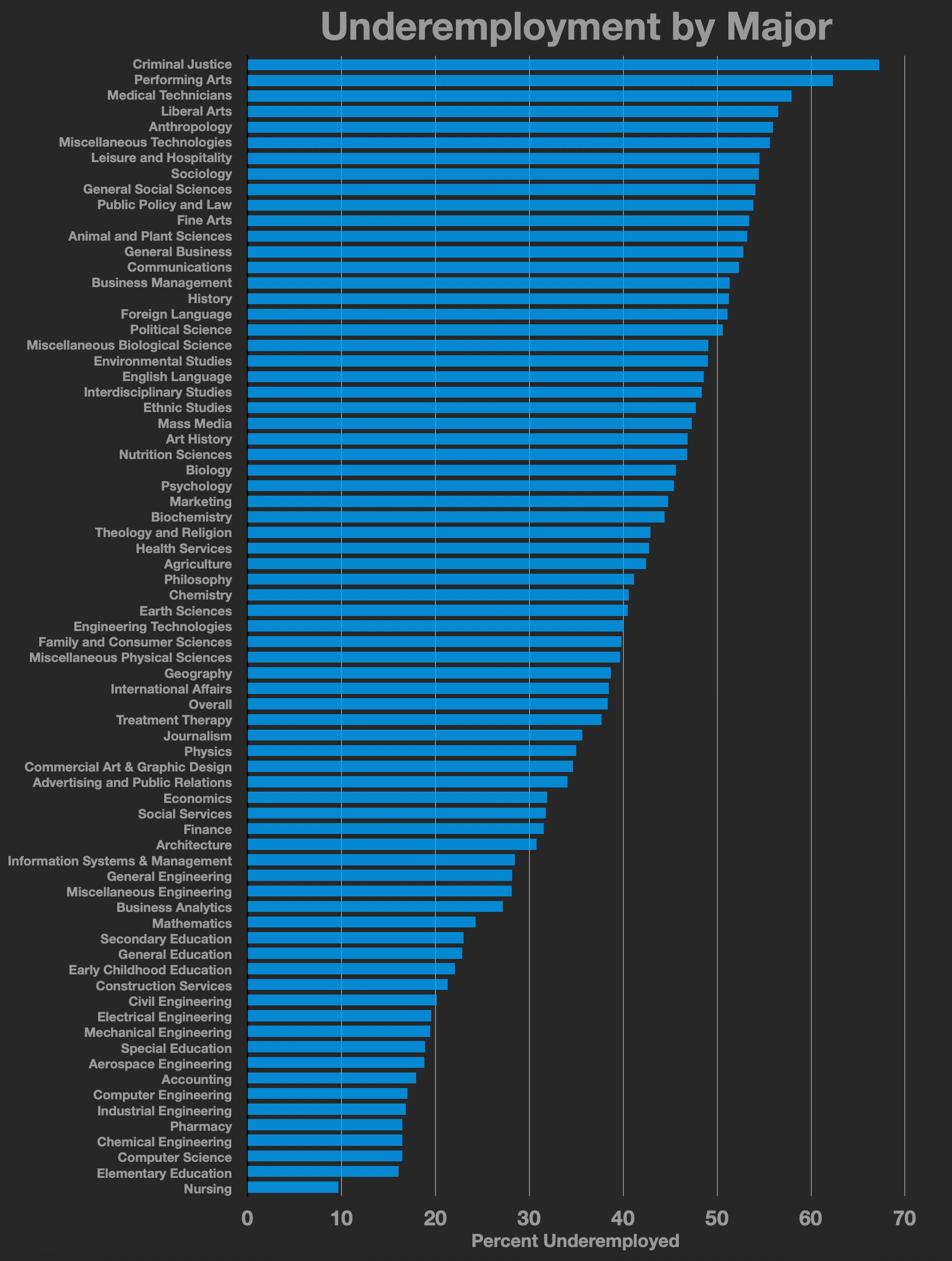
Underemployment by major in the United States

== Arts and entertainment ==
- List of artistic occupations
- List of dance occupations
- List of entertainer occupations
- List of film and television occupations
- List of theatre personnel
- List of writing occupations

== Business ==
- List of corporate titles

== Computer ==
- List of programming occupations

== Construction ==
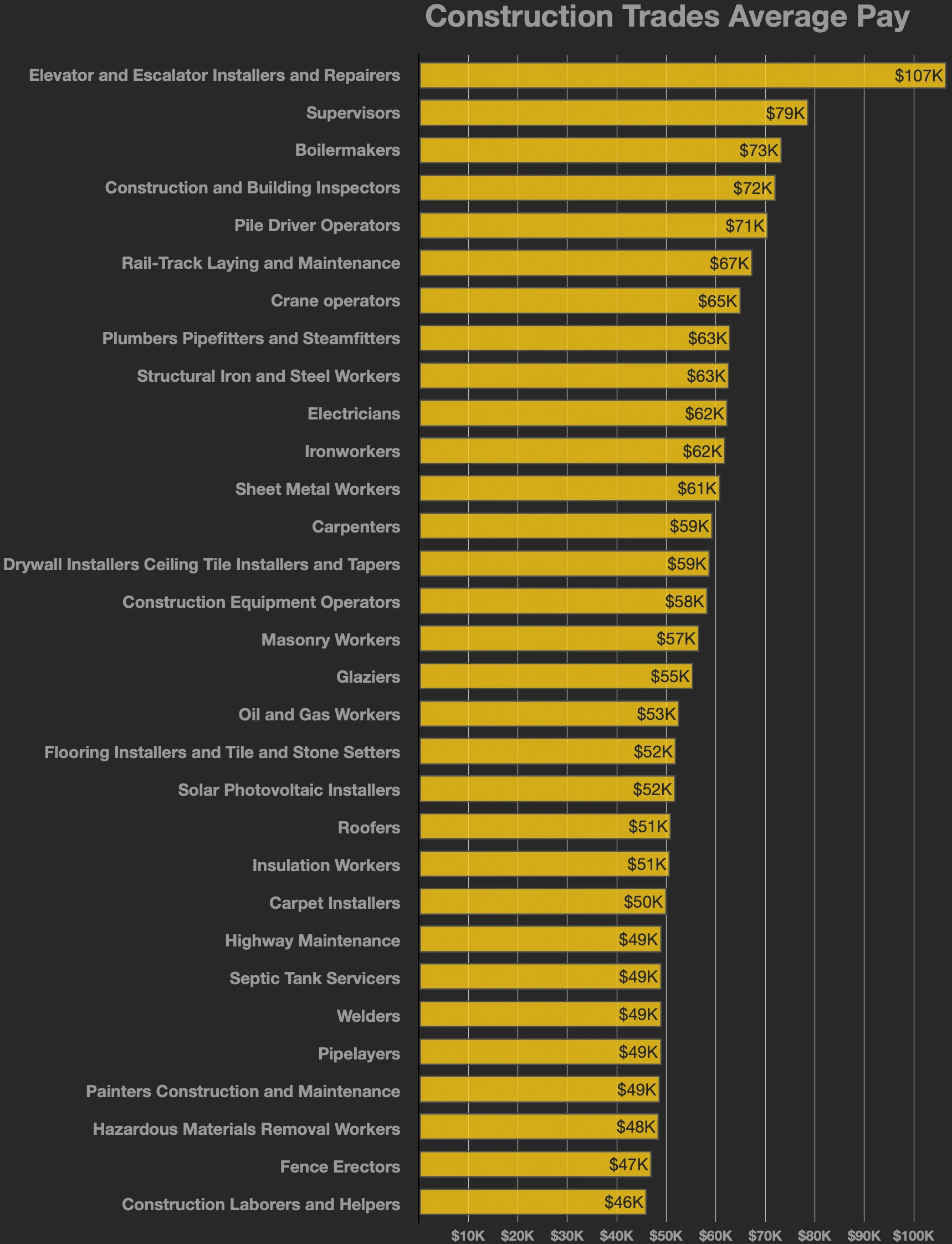
Construction trades average pay in USD

Construction professions pay

- List of construction occupations
- List of construction trades
- List of heavy equipment operator types

== Design ==
- List of graphic design occupations

== Education ==
- Education and training occupations

== Health care ==
- List of healthcare occupations
- List of nursing specialties
- List of medical specialties

== Industrial and manufacturing ==
- List of industrial occupations
- List of manufacturing occupations
- List of metalworking occupations
- List of petroleum industry occupations
- List of sewing occupations

== Military ==
- List of military special forces units
- List of military aviation occupations
- List of Air Force Specialty Codes
- List of United States Army careers
- List of United States Coast Guard ratings
- List of United States Marine Corps MOS
- List of United States Navy ratings

== Science and technology ==
- List of engineering branches
- List of NASA's flight control positions
- List of robotics occupations
- List of scientific occupations
- List of semiconductor occupations
- Occupations in electrical/electronics engineering

== Transportation ==
- List of logistics occupations
- List of professional driver types
- List of railway industry occupations
- Seafarer's professions and ranks

== See also ==
- Lists of people by occupation
- List of gig economy companies
- List of blue-collar jobs
- List of white-collar jobs
- List of companies of the United States by state
- List of trucking companies in the United States
- List of automotive assembly plants in the United States
- List of Largest manufacturing plants in the United States
- List of semiconductor companies in the United States
- Outline of academic disciplines
- Profession
- Work (human activity)
