= List of manufacturing occupations =

Occupations involved in manufacturing

This is a list of manufacturing occupations which includes occupations where workers are directly involved in the production and assembly of goods, as well as occupations supporting manufacturing through machinery maintenance, automation, quality control, and engineering.

== Assembly and production lines ==
- Assembly-line worker
- Material handler
- Machine operator
- Production-line worker
- Warehouse worker

== Machining and tooling ==
- CNC machinist
- Machinist
- Model maker
- Moldmaker
- Sawfiler
- Tool and die maker

== Metal fabrication and forming ==
- Blacksmith
- Bladesmith
- Boilermaker
- Goldsmith
- Gunsmith
- Ironworker
- Sheet metal worker
- Shipfitter
- Silversmith
- Tinsmith
- Welder

== Foundry and metal production ==
- Iron founder
- Ironmaster
- Smelter

== Wood products and furniture ==
- Cabinetmaker
- Cooper
- Joiner
- Luthier
- Sawyer (occupation)
- Upholsterer
- Wheelwright
- Woodcarver
- Woodturner

== Textiles, apparel, and leather ==
- Cordwainer
- Doffer
- Dressmaker
- Embroiderer
- Hatter
- Knitter
- Leatherworker
- Sailmaker
- Screen printer
- Seamstress
- Shoemaker
- Tailor
- Weaver

== Food and beverage production ==
- Baker
- Butcher
- Cheesemaker
- Miller

== Glass and ceramics ==
- Glassblower
- Lampworker
- Potter

== Printing and paper production ==
- Bookbinder
- Lithographer
- Papermaker
- Printer (publishing)
- Typesetter

== Maintenance and automation ==
- Automation technician
- Electrician
- Electronics technician
- Mechanic
- Millwright
- Plant operator
- PLC technician
- Quality assurance technician

== Engineering and technical occupations ==
- Automotive engineer
- Chemical engineer
- Electrical engineer
- Industrial engineer
- Industrial and production engineer
- Manufacturing engineer
- Materials engineer
- Mechanical engineer
- Process engineer
- Production engineer
- Quality engineer
- Robotics engineer
- Stationary engineer

== Supervision and production management ==
- Foreman
- Shop foreman

== Manufacturing fields ==
- Additive manufacturing
- Aerospace industry
- Automotive industry
- Casting
- Chemical industry
- Computer industry
- Electronics industry
- Food processing
- Forging
- Garment industry
- Glass production
- Injection moulding
- Machining
- Papermaking
- Pharmaceutical manufacturing
- Plastics industry
- Printed circuit board manufacturing
- Pulp and paper industry
- Semiconductor device fabrication
- Shipbuilding
- Steelmaking
- Textile manufacturing
- Tire manufacturing

== See also ==
- Blue-collar jobs
- Flex space
- Applications of 3D printing
- List of 3D printing software
- List of automotive assembly plants in the United States
- List of current automobile manufacturers by country
- List of industrial occupations
- Lists of occupations
