= List of logistics occupations =

Occupations in logistics and transportation

This is a list of logistics occupations, including occupations involved in logistics, supply chain management, warehousing, distribution, and the transportation of passengers and goods. Transportation and material-moving occupations include workers in road transport, rail transport, air transportation, and maritime transport, as well as workers involved in freight transport, stock, and material handling.

== Logistics and supply chain ==
- Customs broker
- Freight forwarder
- Logistician
- Logistics officer
- Purchasing manager
- Supply chain manager

== Warehousing and material handling ==
- Forklift operator
- Material handler
- Order picker
- Overhead crane operator
- Warehouse worker

== Postal and delivery occupations ==
- Bicycle messenger
- Courier
- Mail carrier
- Package delivery driver
- Postal clerk

== Gig economy logistics occupations ==
- Delivery driver
- Food delivery courier
- Grocery delivery driver
- Personal shopper
- Rideshare driver

== Road transportation ==
- Bicycle courier
- Bus driver
- Chauffeur
- Courier
- Delivery driver
- Dispatcher
- Rideshare driver
- Taxi driver
- Weigh station operator

=== Truck drivers ===
- Armored truck driver
- Box truck driver
- Car carrier driver
- Dump truck driver
- Flatbed truck driver
- Garbage truck driver
- Hopper trailer driver
- Logging truck driver
- Lowboy trailer driver
- Oversize load operator
- Refrigerated truck driver
- Tank truck driver
- Tow truck driver

== Rail transportation ==
- Conductor
- Locomotive engineer
- Station master
- Switch operator
- Train dispatcher
- Yardmaster

=== Intermodal and rail-yard operations ===
- Autorack loader
- Reach stacker operator
- Rubber-tired gantry crane operator
- Straddle carrier operator
- Yard spotter

== Heavy equipment operators ==
=== Dump truck operators ===
- Articulated hauler operator
- Dump truck operator
- Haul truck operator

=== Crane operators ===
- Aerial crane operator
- Container crane operator
- Crane vessel operator
- Crawler crane operator
- Gantry crane operator
- Level-luffing crane operator
- Mobile crane operator
- Overhead crane operator
- Railroad crane operator
- Ring crane operator
- Tower crane operator

=== Material handling operators ===
- Forklift operator
- Loader operator
- Reach stacker operator
- Sidelifter operator
- Straddle carrier operator
- Telescopic handler operator

=== Specialized transport equipment operators ===
- Crawler-transporter operator
- Railcar switching operator
- Pushback tractor operator
- Travel lift operator

== Maritime and port occupations ==
=== Maritime occupations ===
- Able seaman
- Boatswain
- Captain
- Deck officer
- Marine engineer
- Maritime pilot
- Ship broker
- Shipping agent
- Tugboat operator
- Wind turbine installation vessel operator

=== Inland waterways occupations ===
- Barge operator
- Bridge tender
- Lock and dam operator
- Towboat operator
- Trip pilot

=== Port operations ===
- Container crane operator
- Dockworker
- Loading master
- Longshoreman
- Reach stacker operator
- Rubber-tired gantry crane operator
- Straddle carrier operator
- Yard spotter

== Aviation transportation ==
- Aerial crane operator
- Air cargo handler
- Air traffic controller
- Aircraft marshaller
- Airline pilot
- Baggage handler
- Federal Air Marshal
- Flight attendant
- Flight dispatcher
- Flight engineer
- Helicopter pilot
- Loadmaster
- Pilot
- Pushback operator

== Space transportation occupations ==
- Astronaut
- Crawler-transporter operator
- Flight controller
- Mission controller
- Payload specialist

== Food and agricultural logistics occupations ==
- Cold storage operator
- Grain bin operator
- Grain elevator operator
- Livestock transporter
- Refrigerated truck driver

== Traffic control occupations ==
- Crossing guard
- Flagger
- Traffic police officer

== Military logistics occupations ==
- Embarkation specialist
- Loadmaster
- Quartermaster

== Engineering and systems ==
- Industrial engineer
- Operations research analyst
- Systems engineer

== Specialized logistics ==
- Cold-chain specialist
- Humanitarian logistics specialist
- Reverse logistics specialist

== See also ==
- Cargo
- Freight transport
- Intermodal freight transport
- List of logistics companies
- Lists of occupations
- Supply chain management
- Transport
- Warehouse
