= List of scientific occupations =

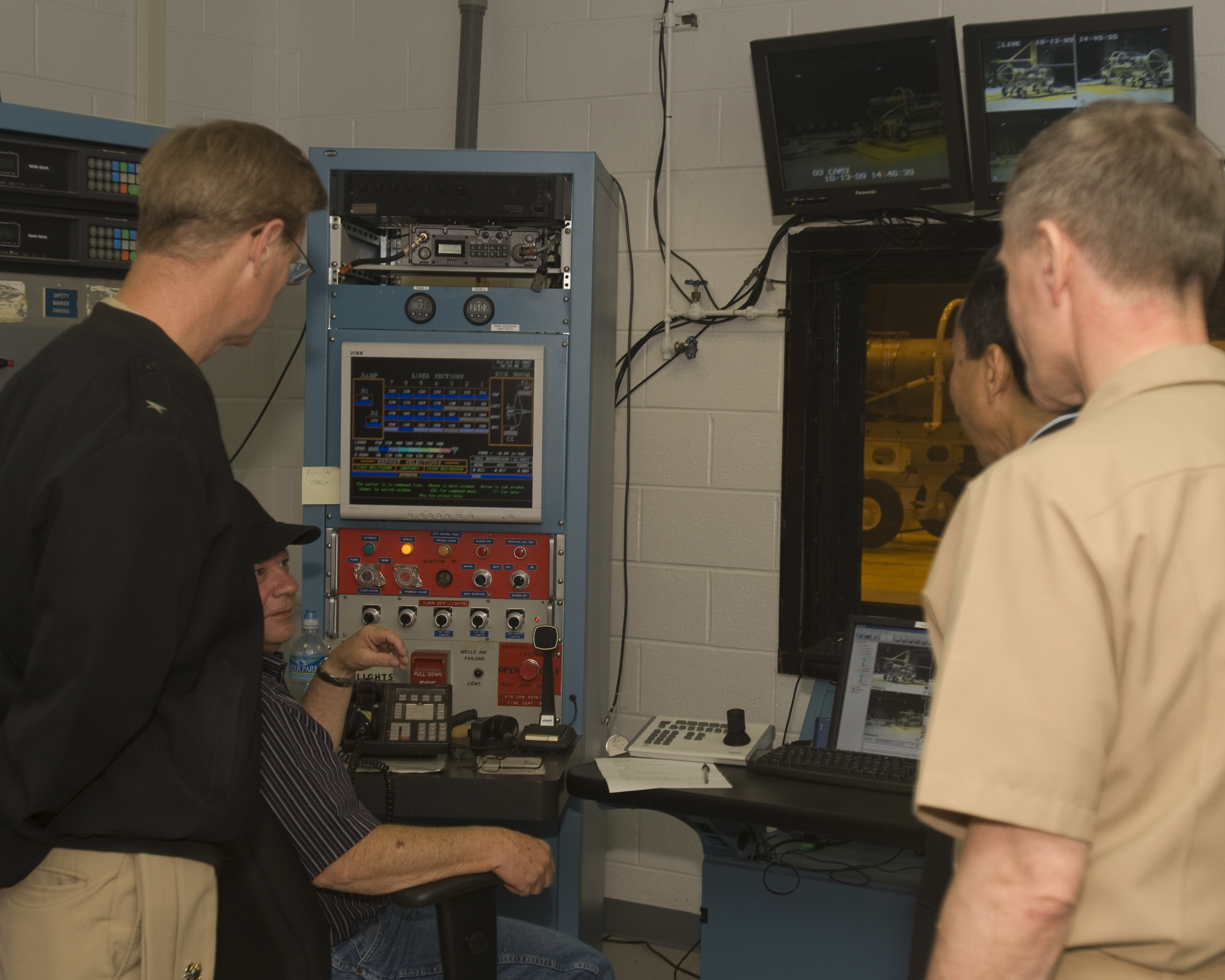
An engineering technician explains instrument readings.

This list is of science and science-related occupations, which include various scientific occupations and careers based upon scientific research disciplines and explorers.

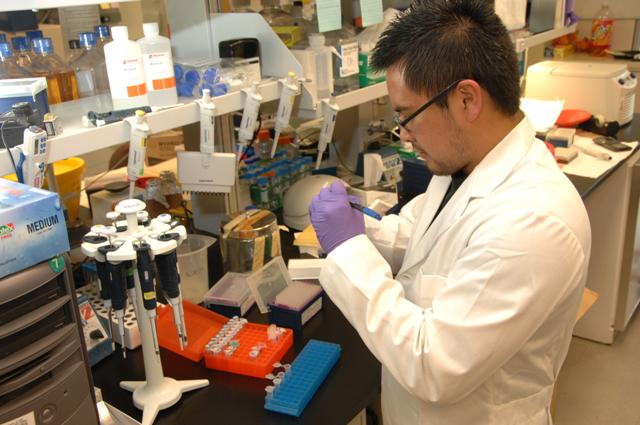
A medical laboratory scientist at the National Institutes of Health preparing DNA samples

== Life science ==
- Biologist
- Biomedical scientist
- Botanist
- Clinical pharmaceutical scientist
- Ecologist
- Geneticist
- Herpetologist
- Medical laboratory scientist
- Microbiologist
- Neuroscientist
- Physician
- Veterinarian
- Zoologist
- Bioinformatician

== Applied science ==
- Aeronautical engineer
- Biomedical engineer
- Chemical engineer
- Civil engineer
- Computer engineer
- Educational technologist
- Electrical engineer
- Engineering technician
- Engineering technologist
- Mechanical engineer
- Petrochemical engineer

== Formal science ==
- Computational scientist
- Mathematician – A person with an extensive knowledge of mathematics, a field informally defined as being concerned with numbers, data, collection, quantity, structure, space and calculus.

== Statistics ==
- Actuary
- Demographic marketer
- Statistician

== General scientific occupations ==
- Forensic scientist
- Gentleman scientist – A financially independent scientist who pursues scientific study as a hobby
- Government scientist
- Healthcare science
- Hiwi – A German abbreviation for "assistant scientist"
- Inventor
- Psychologist
- Research fellow
- School science technician
- Science attaché – A member of a diplomatic mission (usually an embassy) that focuses on scientific and technical matters
- Scientist

== Natural science ==
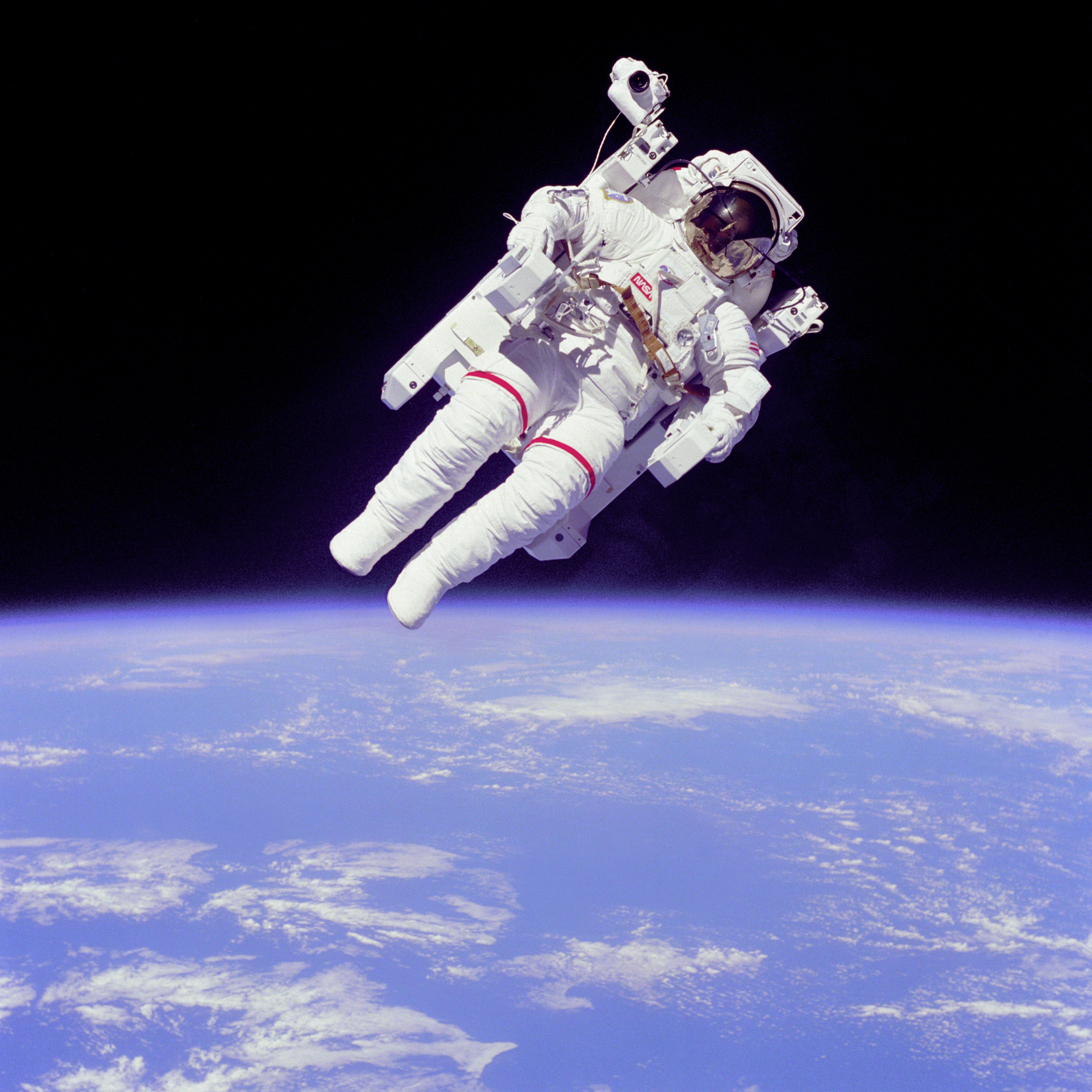
Astronaut Bruce McCandless II using Manned Maneuvering Unit outside the United States Space Shuttle Challenger in 1984

- Archaeologist
- Astronaut
- Astronomer
- Biochemist
- Biologist
- Chemist
- Ecologist
- Forester
- Geographer
- Naturalist
- Oceanographer
- Paleontologist
- Pathologist

== Physical science ==
- Chemist
- Physicist

== Earth science ==
- Geographer
- Geologist
- Geoprofessions
- Petroleum geologist

== Social science ==
- Anthropologist
- Economist
- Historian
- Linguist
- Political scientist
- Sociologist
- Urban planner

== See also ==
- Lists of occupations
