= Industrial dashboard =

An Industrial Dashboard is a graphical display of manufacturing information via programming. Much like the dashboard in a car, an Industrial Dashboard shows data collected from a multitude of sensors displayed as one quick overview of the general operating situation. The Industrial Dashboard typically involves use of Java Script, Html5, and PHP.

In the simplest form, an Industrial Dashboard may show just one metric from a manufacturing process. This might start with a count of product produced from a machine. A more complex approach to Industrial Dashboarding would be a series of "drill down" click points - starting with a dashboard screen showing a summary of production for the whole plant. Various points on that screen would be clickable to drill down into more and more dashboard screens until reaching a dashboard of very detailed data on a single machine or Machine Operator Efficiency of a single employee.

There are several hardware technology approaches to retrieving data from the machinery. The science of interfacing industrial machines is widely referred to as Industry4.0 or IIoT (Industrial Internet of Things). Some industry standards such as MTConnect are emerging in an attempt make CNC machine tools produce production data in a uniform format to web servers.
