= Military aviation =

Use of aircraft by armed forces in combat or other military capacity

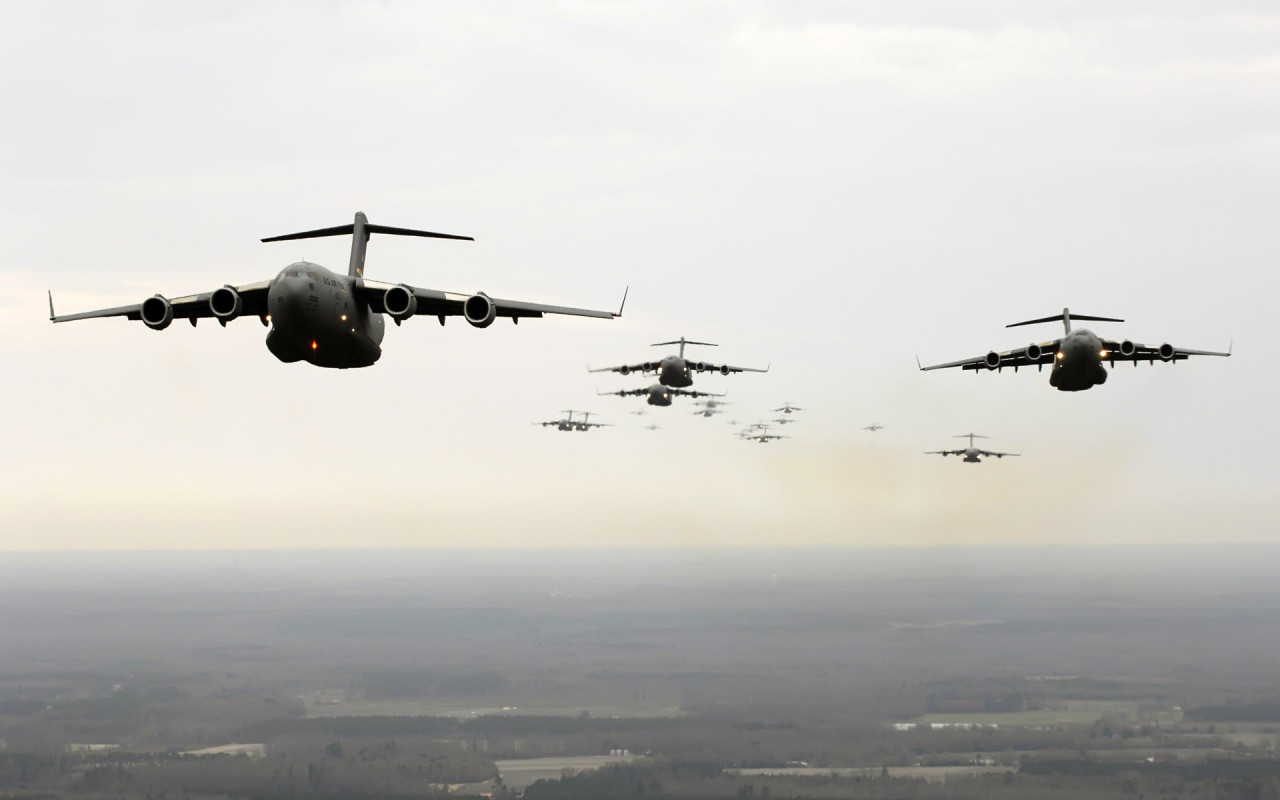
A squadron of USAF C-17A transports on an air drop operation

Military aviation is the design, development and use of military aircraft and other flying machines for the purposes of conducting or enabling aerial warfare, including national airlift (air cargo) capacity to provide logistical supply to forces stationed in a war theater or along a front. Airpower includes the national means of conducting such warfare, including the intersection of transport and warcraft. Military aircraft include bombers, fighters, transports, trainer aircraft, and reconnaissance aircraft.

== History ==
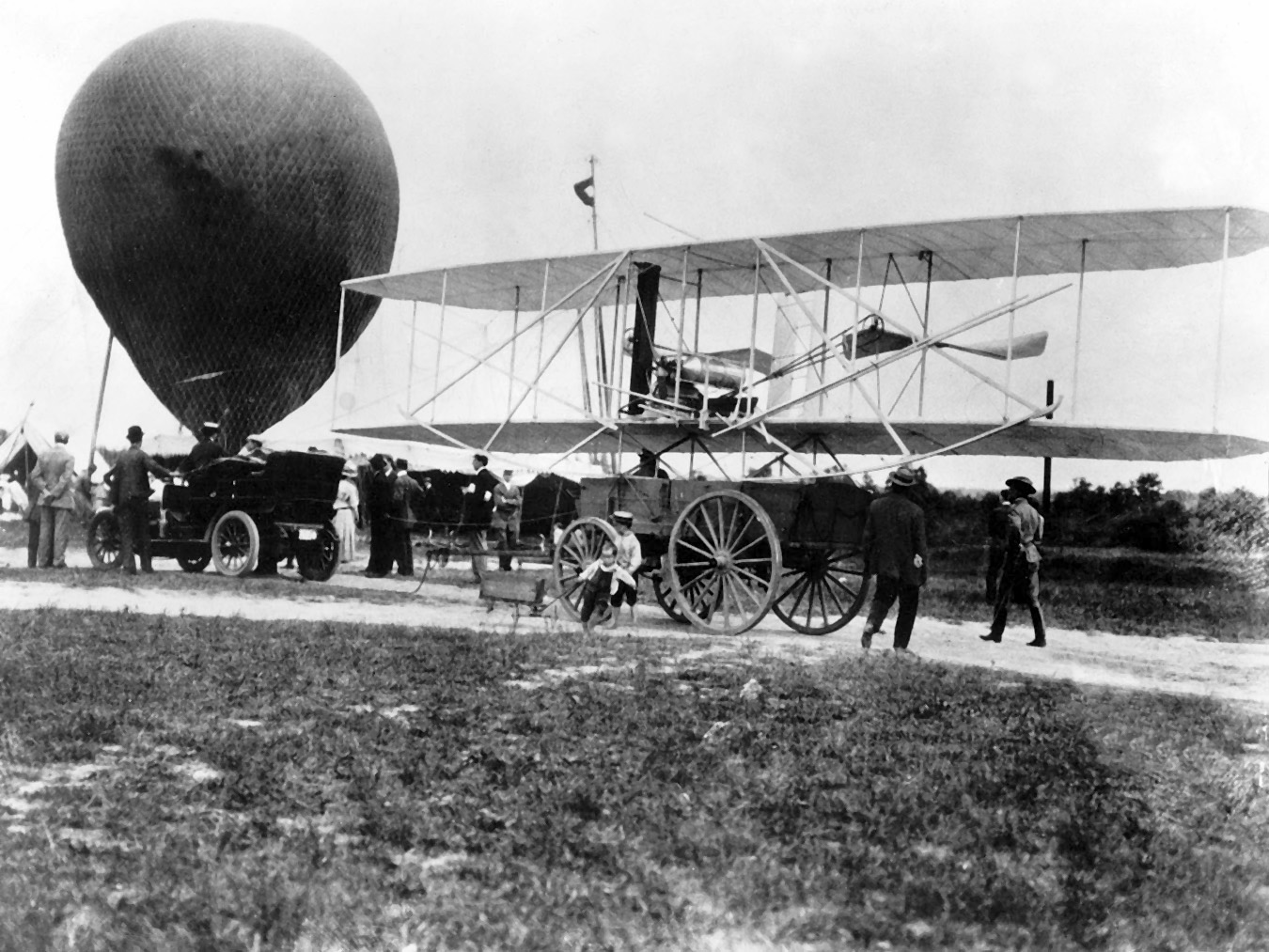
The Wright 1908 Model A Military Flyer arrives at Fort Myer, Virginia aboard a wagon

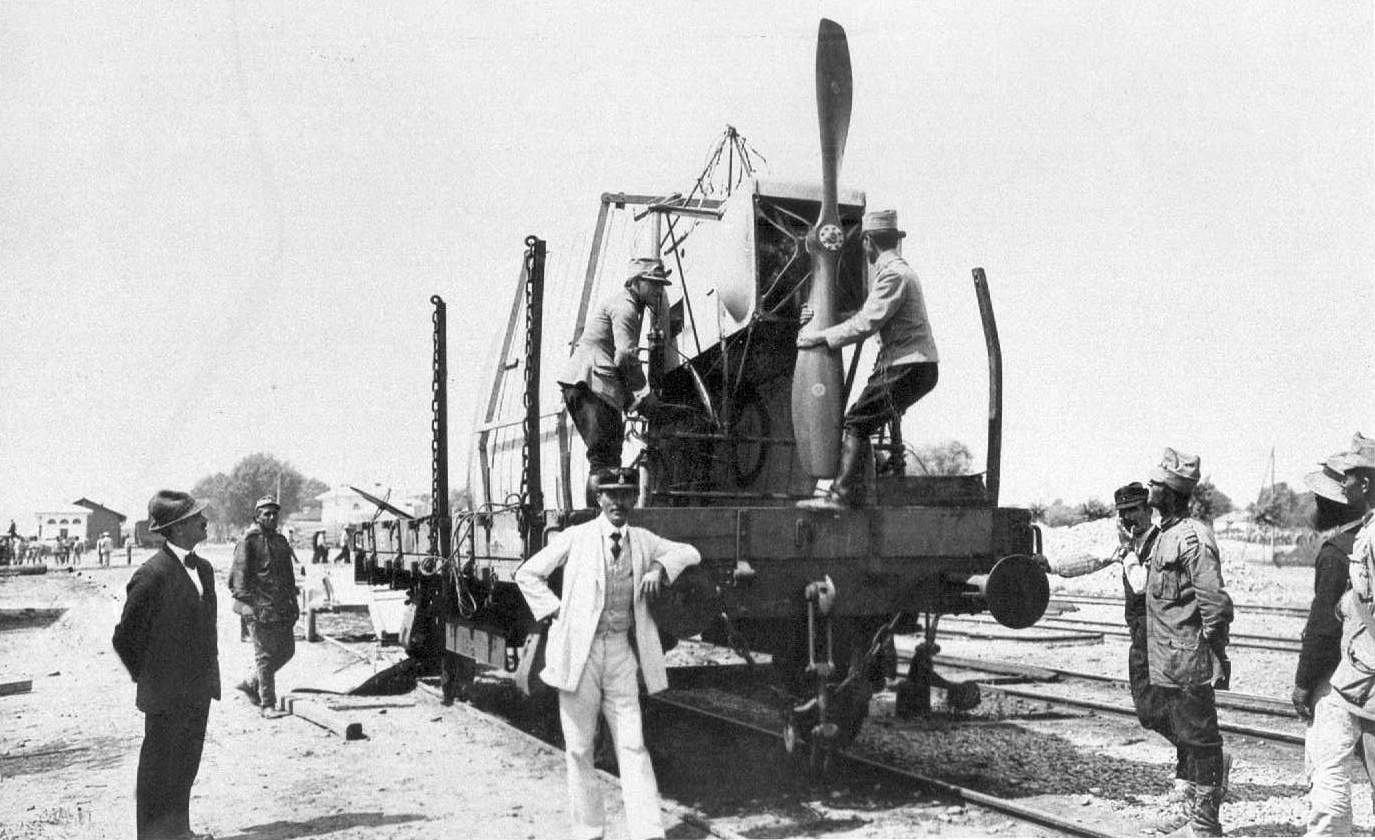
Unloading of a Blériot XI-2 artillery spotting monoplane of the Romanian Army during the Second Balkan War in 1913

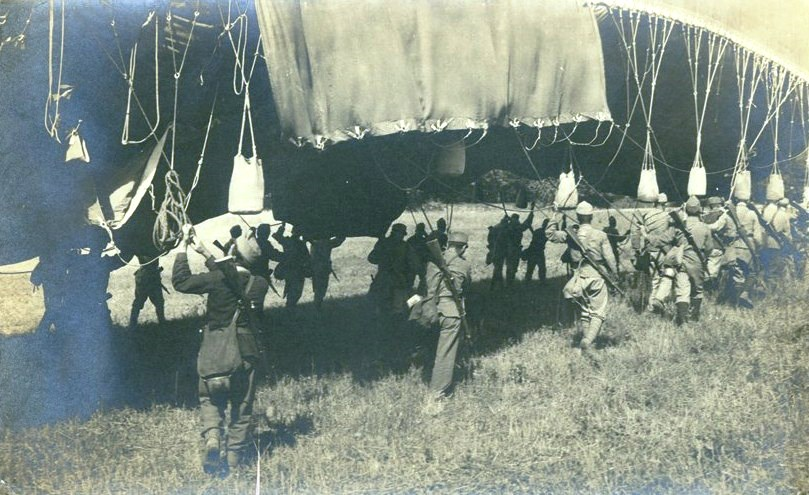
Austro-Hungarian soldiers transport a military balloon during World War I in 1914

The first military uses of aviation involved lighter-than-air balloons. During the Battle of Fleurus in 1794, the French observation balloon l'Entreprenant was used to monitor Austrian troop movements. The use of lighter-than-air aircraft in warfare became prevalent in the 19th century, including regular use in the American Civil War. Lighter-than-air military aviation persisted until shortly after World War II, gradually being withdrawn from various roles as heavier-than-air aircraft improved.

Heavier-than-air aircraft were recognized as having military applications early on, despite resistance from traditionalists and the severe limitations of early aircraft. The U.S. Army Signal Corps purchased a Wright Model A on 2 August 1909 which became the first military aircraft in history. In 1911, the Italians used a variety of aircraft types in reconnaissance, photo-reconnaissance, and bombing roles during the Italo-Turkish War. On October 23, 1911, an Italian pilot, Captain Carlo Piazza, flew over Turkish lines on the world's first aerial reconnaissance mission, and on November 1, the first ever aerial bomb was dropped by Sottotenente Giulio Gavotti, on Turkish troops in Libya, from an early model of Etrich Taube aircraft. The Turks, lacking anti-aircraft weapons, were the first to shoot down an airplane by rifle fire.

The earliest military role filled by aircraft was reconnaissance, however, by the end of World War I, military aviation had rapidly embraced many specialized roles, such as artillery spotting, air superiority, bombing, ground attack, and anti-submarine patrols. Technological improvements were made at a frenzied pace, and the first all-metal cantilevered airplanes were going into service as the war ended.

Between the major world wars incremental improvements made in many areas, especially powerplants, aerodynamics, structures, and weapons, led to an even more rapid advance in aircraft technology during World War II, with large performance increases and the introduction of aircraft into new roles, including Airborne Early Warning, electronic warfare, weather reconnaissance, and flying lifeboats. Great Britain used aircraft to suppress revolts throughout the Empire during the interwar period and introduced the first military transports, which revolutionized logistics, allowing troops and supplies to be quickly delivered over vastly greater distances.

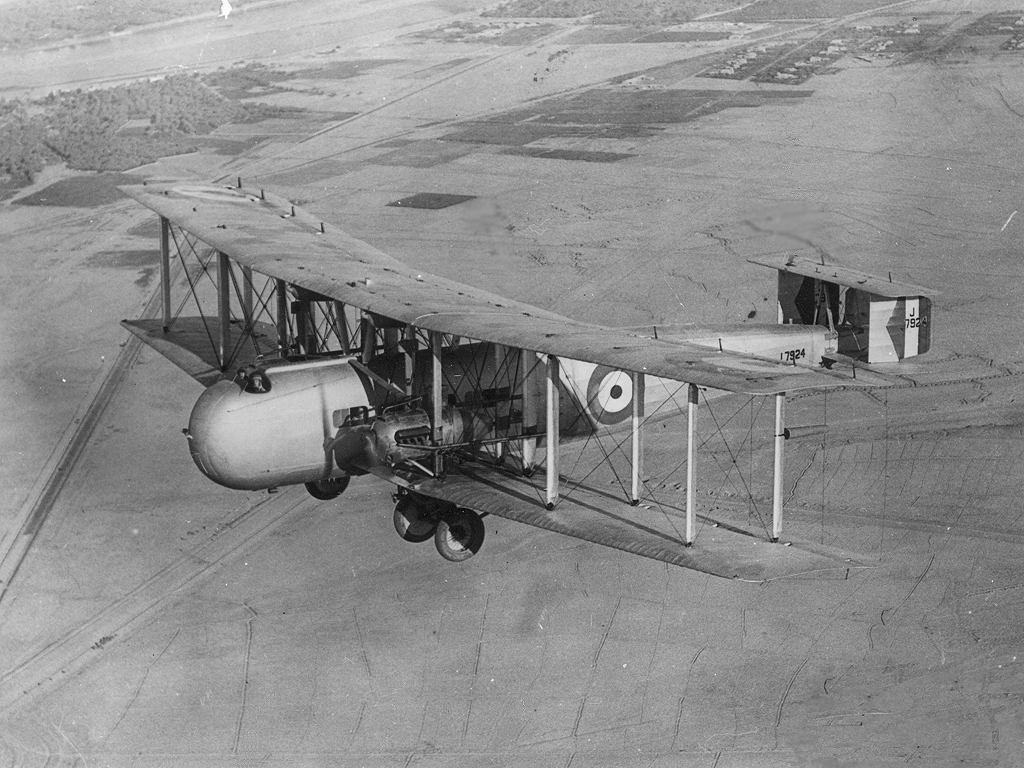
Vickers Victoria heavy transport

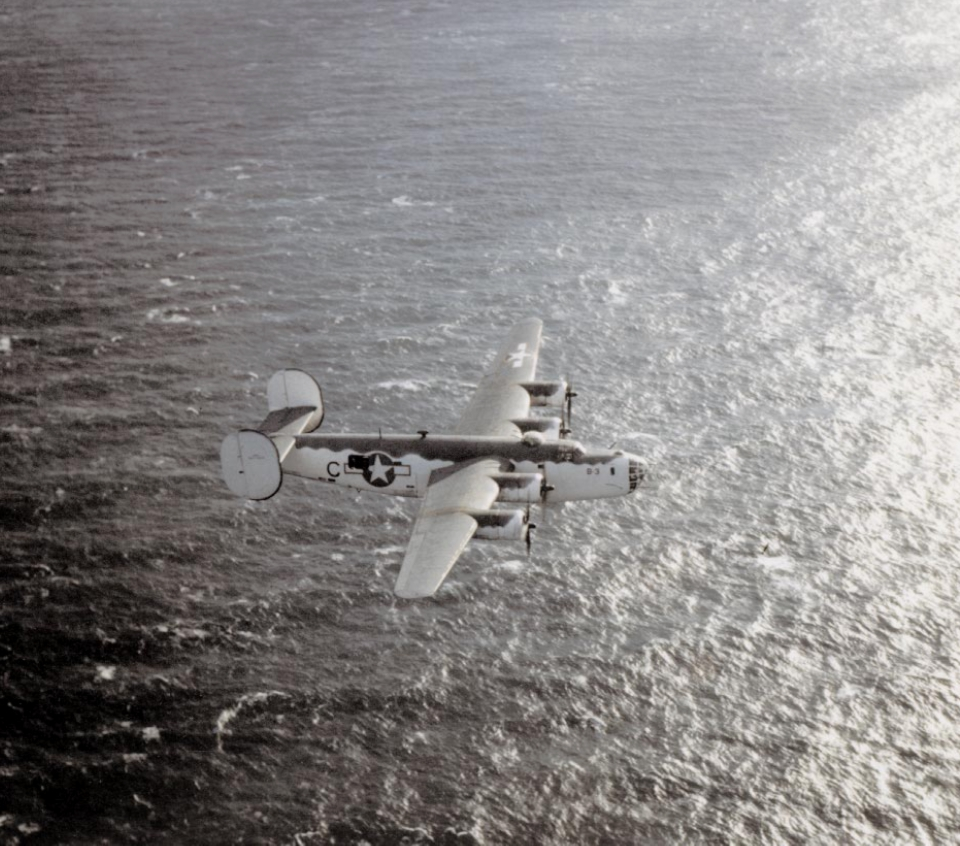
US Navy VPB-103 PB4Y-1 Liberator long range maritime patrol aircraft

While they first appeared during World War I, ground attack aircraft didn't provide a decisive contribution until the Germans introduced Blitzkrieg during the Invasion of Poland and Battle of France, where aircraft functioned as mobile flying artillery to quickly disrupt defensive formations. The Allies would later use rocket-equipped fighters in the same role, immobilizing German armored divisions during the Battle of Normandy and afterwards. World War I also saw the creation of the first strategic bomber units, however, they wouldn't be tested until the Spanish Civil War where the perceived effects of mass bombardment would encourage their widespread use during World War II. Carrier aviation also first appeared during World War I, and likewise came to play a major role during World War II, with most major navies recognizing the aircraft carrier's advantages over the battleship and devoting massive resources to the building of new carriers.

During World War II, U-boats threatened the ability of the Allies to transport troops and war materiel to Europe, spurring the development of very long range Maritime patrol aircraft, whose capability of independently detecting and destroying submerged submarines was greatly increased with new detection systems, including sonobuoys, Leigh Lights, and radar, along with better weapons including homing torpedoes and improved depth charges. This played a major role in winning the Battle of the Atlantic. Aircraft also played a much expanded role, with many notable engagements being decided solely through the use of military aircraft, such as the Battle of Britain or the attack on Pearl Harbor, and the conclusion of the Pacific War against Japan was marked by two lone aircraft dropping the atomic bombs, devastating the cities of Hiroshima and Nagasaki. The introduction of the jet engine, radar, early missiles, helicopters, and computers are World War II advancements which are felt to the present day.

Post World War II, the development of military aviation was spurred by the Cold War stand-off between the super-powers. The helicopter appeared late in World War II and matured into an indispensable part of military aviation, transporting troops and providing expanded anti-submarine capabilities to smaller warships, negating the need for large numbers of small carriers. The need to out-perform opponents pushed new technology and aircraft developments in the U.S.S.R. and the United States, among others, and the Korean War and the Vietnam War tested the resulting designs. Incredible advances in electronics were made, starting with the first electronic computers during World War II and steadily expanding from its original role of cryptography into communications, data processing, reconnaissance, remotely piloted aircraft, and many other roles until it has become an integral aspect of modern warfare. In the early 1960s, missiles were expected to replace manned interceptors and the guns in other manned aircraft. They failed to live up to expectations as surface-to-air missiles lacked flexibility and were not as effective as manned interceptors, and fighters equipped only with air-to-air missiles had limited effectiveness against opposing aircraft which could avoid being hit. Missiles were also expensive, especially against low-value ground targets. The 1970s saw the return of the gun-armed fighter, and a greater emphasis on maneuverability. The 1980s through to the present day were characterized by stealth technology and other countermeasures.

Today, a country's military aviation forces are often the first line of defense against an attack, or the first forces to attack the enemy, and effective military aviation forces (or lack thereof) have proved decisive in several recent conflicts such as the Gulf War.

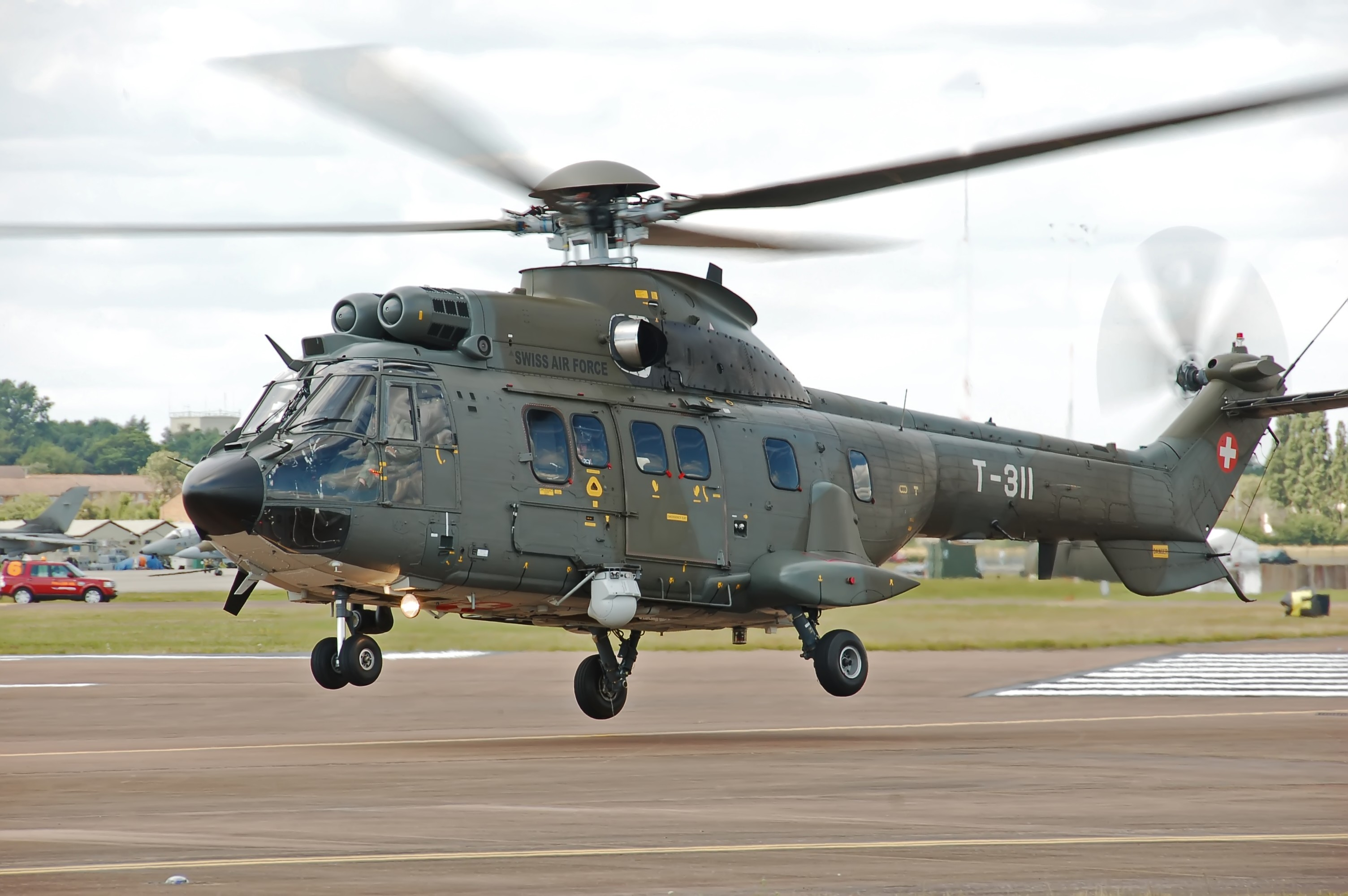
Swiss Air Force Airbus Helicopters Super Puma arrives for the 2014 Royal International Air Tattoo, England. The Swiss Air Force uses it for transport, fire fighting and relief work.

== Categories ==
Airborne Early Warning provides advance warning of enemy activities to reduce the chance of being surprised. Many also have command functions that allow them to direct or vector friendly fighters onto incoming bogeys.

Bombers are capable of carrying large payloads of bombs and may sacrifice speed or maneuverability to maximize payload.

Experimental aircraft are designed to test advanced aerodynamic, structural, avionic, or propulsion concepts. These are usually well instrumented, with performance data telemetered on radio-frequency data links to ground stations located at the test ranges where they are flown.

Fighters establish and maintain air superiority. Speed and maneuverability are usually requirements and they carry a variety of weapons, including machine guns and guided missiles, to do this.

Forward Air Control directs close air support aircraft to ensure that the intended targets are nullified and friendly troops remain uninjured.

Ground-attack aircraft support ground troops by weakening or nullifying enemy defenses. Helicopter gunships and specialized ground attack aircraft attack enemy armor or troops and provide close air support for ground troops.

Liaison aircraft are usually small, unarmed aircraft used to deliver messages and key personnel.

Maritime Patrol Aircraft are used to control sea-lanes, and are often equipped with special electronic gear for detecting and sinking submarines, such as sonar. They are also used for search and rescue missions and fisheries patrols.

Multirole combat aircraft combine the capabilities of both a fighter or a bomber, depending on what the mission calls for.

Reconnaissance aircraft and scout helicopters are primarily used to gather intelligence. They are equipped with photographic, infrared, radar, and television sensors. This role is increasingly being filled by spy satellites and unmanned aerial vehicles.

Refueling aircraft are used to refuel fighters and reconnaissance aircraft, extending mission reach and flying range. These aircraft include but are not limited to the KC-135, KC-46, KC-767, A310 MRTT, and the KC-130J. These aircraft are a part of many countries' militant assets.

Training aircraft are used to train recruits to fly aircraft and to provide additional training for specialized roles such as in air combat.

Transport aircraft transport troops and supplies. Cargo can be on pallets for quick unloading. Cargo, and personnel may also be discharged from flying aircraft on parachutes. Also included in this category are aerial tankers, which can refuel other aircraft while in flight. Helicopters and gliders can transport troops and supplies to areas where other aircraft would be unable to land.

== Air forces ==
An air force is the branch of a nation's armed forces that is responsible for aerial warfare as distinct from the army, navy, or other branches. Most nations either maintain an air force or, in the case of smaller and less well-developed countries, an air wing (see List of air forces). Air forces are usually tasked with the air defense of a country, as well as strategic bombing, interdiction, close air support, intelligence gathering, battlespace management, transport functions, and providing services to civil government agencies. Air force operations may also include space-based operations such as reconnaissance or satellite operations.

== Other branches ==
A USN F-14 fighter intercepting a Russian Tu-95 long range nuclear bomber

Other branches of a nation's armed forces may use aviation (naval aviation and army aviation), in addition to or instead of, a dedicated air force. In some cases, this includes coast guard services that are also an armed service, as well as gendarmeries and equivalent forces.

== See also ==
- Police aviation
- Civil aviation
- Military aviation occupations
- Military aircraft insignia
