= List of programming occupations =

List of occupations involving computer programming

This is a list of programming occupations involving computer programming, software development, and related work in which writing, testing, maintaining, or reviewing source code is a significant part of the occupation. The titles used for programming work vary by industry, employer, country, and seniority, and may overlap with broader occupations such as software developer, software engineer, systems analyst, and web developer.

== General programming occupations ==
- Computer programmer
- Programmer analyst
- Software developer
- Software engineer
- Maintenance programmer
- Systems analyst
- Systems programmer

== Application and platform development ==
- Application software developer
- Mobile app developer
- Web developer
- Software porting engineer
- Front-end developer
- Back-end developer
- Full-stack developer

== AI and machine learning ==
- AI engineer
- Machine learning engineer
- Deep learning engineer
- Natural language processing engineer
- Computational linguist
- Large language model developer
- Chatbot developer
- RAG engineer
- Prompt engineer
- Robotics software engineer

== Quantum programming ==
- Quantum software engineer
- Quantum algorithm developer

== Cybersecurity and cryptography ==
- White-hat hacker
- Penetration tester
- Security researcher
- Bug bounty hunter
- Security engineer
- Information security analyst
- Malware analyst
- Reverse engineer
- Cryptographer
- Cryptanalyst

== Game programming ==
- Video game programmer
- Gameplay programmer
- Game engine programmer
- Game scripter
- Physics engine programmer
- Sound programmer

== Embedded and systems software ==
- Embedded software developer
- Firmware engineer
- Device driver developer
- Kernel developer
- Compiler engineer

== Data and scientific ==
- Algorithm developer
- Algorithm engineer
- Data engineer
- Data cleansing specialist
- Database administrator
- Bioinformatics programmer
- Scientific programmer
- Research software engineer

== Software testing and quality ==
- Software quality assurance analyst
- Software tester
- Test automation engineer

== Infrastructure and developer operations ==
- DevOps engineer
- Site reliability engineer
- Platform engineer
- Build engineer

== Related occupations ==
- Computer scientist
- Computer engineer
- Software architect
- Software documentation writer
- Technical writer

== See also ==
- Independent software developer
- List of AI-assisted software development tools
- List of chatbots
- List of data mining software
- List of integrated development environments
- List of programmers
- List of open-source programming languages
- List of programming languages
- List of software development philosophies
- List of software programming journals
- Lists of programming software development tools
- Lists of occupations
- Open-source software development
- Software industry
- Vibe coding
- World's largest software companies
