= List of film and television occupations =

The following is a list of film- and television-related occupations.

== Animation ==
Title(s)	Area	Description
Animator	Film	Artist who creates multiple images that give an illusion of movement called animation when displayed in rapid sequence; the images are called frames and key frames. Animators can work in a variety of fields including film, television, video games, and the internet.
Cartoonist	TV	Specializes in drawing cartoons. This work is usually humorous, mainly created for entertainment, political commentary or advertising.
Tweener	Film and TV	Makes drawings between the "key poses" drawn by the animator, and also re-draw any sketches that are too roughly made to be used as such.

== Film-specific ==
Title(s)	Description
Casting director	Chooses the actors for the characters of the film. This usually involves inviting potential actors to read an excerpt from the script for an audition.
Cinematographer	Chief over the camera and lighting crews working on a film, responsible for achieving artistic and technical decisions related to the image.
Executive producer	An executive producer (EP) is responsible for financing and marketing a film. They are not involved in technical aspects of filmmaking, but play a financial and sometimes creative role in production. They engage in negotiations, and may have a say in quality control and budget. This role varies, and may be combined with other roles, including aspects of scripting, casting, crewing, or distribution. There are often multiple EPs for a film, and each may work on multiple projects simultaneously. They tend to have experience in other roles, as producer, writer, director or script editor.
Film director	The film director directs the actors and film crew in filmmaking. They control a film's artistic and dramatic aspects, while guiding the technical crew and actors. The director is involved throughout all phases of the film. They are usually experienced in a variety of areas in film such as writing, editing, acting etc.
Film producer	A film producer creates the conditions for making movies. The producer initiates, coordinates, supervises, and controls matters such as raising funding, hiring key personnel, and arranging for distributors. The producer is involved throughout all phases of the film making process from development to completion of a project.
Production manager	The production manager supervises the physical aspects of the production (not the creative aspects) including personnel, technology, budget, and scheduling. It is the production manager's responsibility to make sure the filming stays on schedule and within its budget. The PM also helps manage the day-to-day budget by managing operating costs such as salaries, production costs, and everyday equipment rental costs. The PM often works under the supervision of a line producer and directly supervises the production coordinator.
Screenwriter	The screenwriter, or scriptwriter, may pitch a finished script to potential producers and directors or may write a script under contract to a producer. A writer may be involved, to varied degrees, with creative aspects of production.
Stunt coordinator	Where the film requires a stunt, and involves the use of stunt performers, the stunt coordinator will arrange the casting and performance of the stunt, working closely with the director.

== Television-specific ==
Title(s)	Description
Showrunner	The showrunner is the "chief executive" in charge of everything related to the production of the show. It is the highest-ranking individual who is responsible for the production and daily management of the show. In fictional television, they supervise the writing room as well.
Television director	A television director is in charge of the activities involved in making a television program or section of a program. They are generally responsible for decisions about the editorial content and creative style of a program, and ensuring the producer's vision is delivered. Their duties may include originating program ideas, finding contributors, writing scripts, planning 'shoots', ensuring safety, leading the crew on location, directing contributors and presenters, and working with an editor to assemble the final product. The work of a television director can vary widely depending on the nature of the program, the practices of the production company, whether the program content is factual or drama, and whether it is live or recorded.
Television producer	A television producer oversees one or more aspects of video production on a television program. Some producers take more of an executive role, in that they conceive new programs and pitch them to the television networks, but upon acceptance they focus on business matters, such as budgets and contracts. Other producers are more involved with the day-to-day workings, participating in activities such as screenwriting, set design, casting, and directing.
Television program creator	A television program creator pitches a new TV show idea and sees it through. A television program creator can also be the person who developed a significant part of the format, story, and teleplay, and also has sequel rights to the material.

== Other ==
Title(s)	Area	Description
Actor	Film and TV	person who acts in a dramatic or comic production and who works in film, television, theatre, or radio in that capacity.
Costume designer	Film and TV	designs costumes for a film or stage production.
Foley artist	Film, TV and animation	creates sound effects for films and animations
Lighting technician	Film and TV	
Make-up artist	Film and TV	
News presenter • Reporter; Newscaster • Anchorman	Film and TV	presents news during a news program in the format of a television show, on the radio or the Internet. News presenters can work in a television studio and from remote broadcasts in the field especially weather forecasters.
Screenwriter		
Video editor		
Voice actor	Film and TV	
Weatherman/woman	TV	

== See also ==
- Lists of occupations
