= List of writing occupations =

This is a list of writing occupations organized alphabetically. These are positions, jobs and occupations that typically entail creative, entertaining or informational writing.

- Author
- Blogger
- Book coach
- Commissioning editor
- Copy editor
- Creative consultant
- Dog writer
- Freelancer
- Ghostwriter
- Griot
- Hack writer
- Infopreneur
- Investigative Journalist
- Journalist
- Literary editor
- Manuscript format
- Medical writing
- Novelist
- Poet
- Polygraph (author)
- Review
- Screenwriter
- Scribe
- Script coordinator
- Script doctor
- Scrivener
- Songwriter
- Speechwriter
- Staff writer
- Technical writer
- Website content writer
- Writer

== See also ==
- List of chatbots
- Lists of occupations
