= List of industrial occupations =

The following is a list of industrial occupations. Industrial occupations are generally characterized by being manual-labour-intensive and requiring little to no education.

- Arborist
- Auto body technician
- Auto mechanic
- Blacksmith
- Bobbin boy
- Boilermaker
- Construction worker
- Crane operator
- Electrician
- Factory worker
- Feller
- Filling station attendant
- Foreman
- Machinist
- Maintenance worker
- Mechanic
- Miller
- Millwright
- Moldmaker
- Panel beater
- Patternmaker
- Pipefitter
- Plant operator
- Plumber
- Rigger
- Sawfiler
- Sheet metal worker
- Shipfitter
- Shop foreman
- Soaper
- Stationary engineer
- Tool and die maker
- Toolmaker
- Welder
- Wheelwright
- Woodworkers

== See also ==
- List of blue-collar jobs
