= List of artistic occupations =

This is a list of artistic and creative occupations related to the creation of artistic displays.

- Accessory designer
- Actor
- Advertising designer
- Animator
- Architect
- Art administrator
- Art therapist
- Artisan
- Arts administration
- Art director
- Baker
- Cartoonist
- Ceramics artist
- Chief creative officer
- Colorist
- Comedian
- Concept Artist
- Curator
- Dancer
- Design director
- Design strategist
- Essayist
- Event planner
- Fashion designer
- Fine artist
- Floral designer
- Game designer
- Graphic designer
- Hairstylist
- Illustrator
- Interior designer
- Jewellery designer
- Lyricist
- Make-up artist
- Stylist
- Marine designer
- Media designer
- Musician
- Party planner
- Penciller
- Photographer
- Photojournalist
- Potter
- Production designer
- Sculptor
- Set decorator
- Set dresser
- Singer
- Tattoo artist
- Video game designer
- Web designer
- Wedding planner
- Writer
