= Reach stacker =

Vehicle used for handling intermodal cargo containers

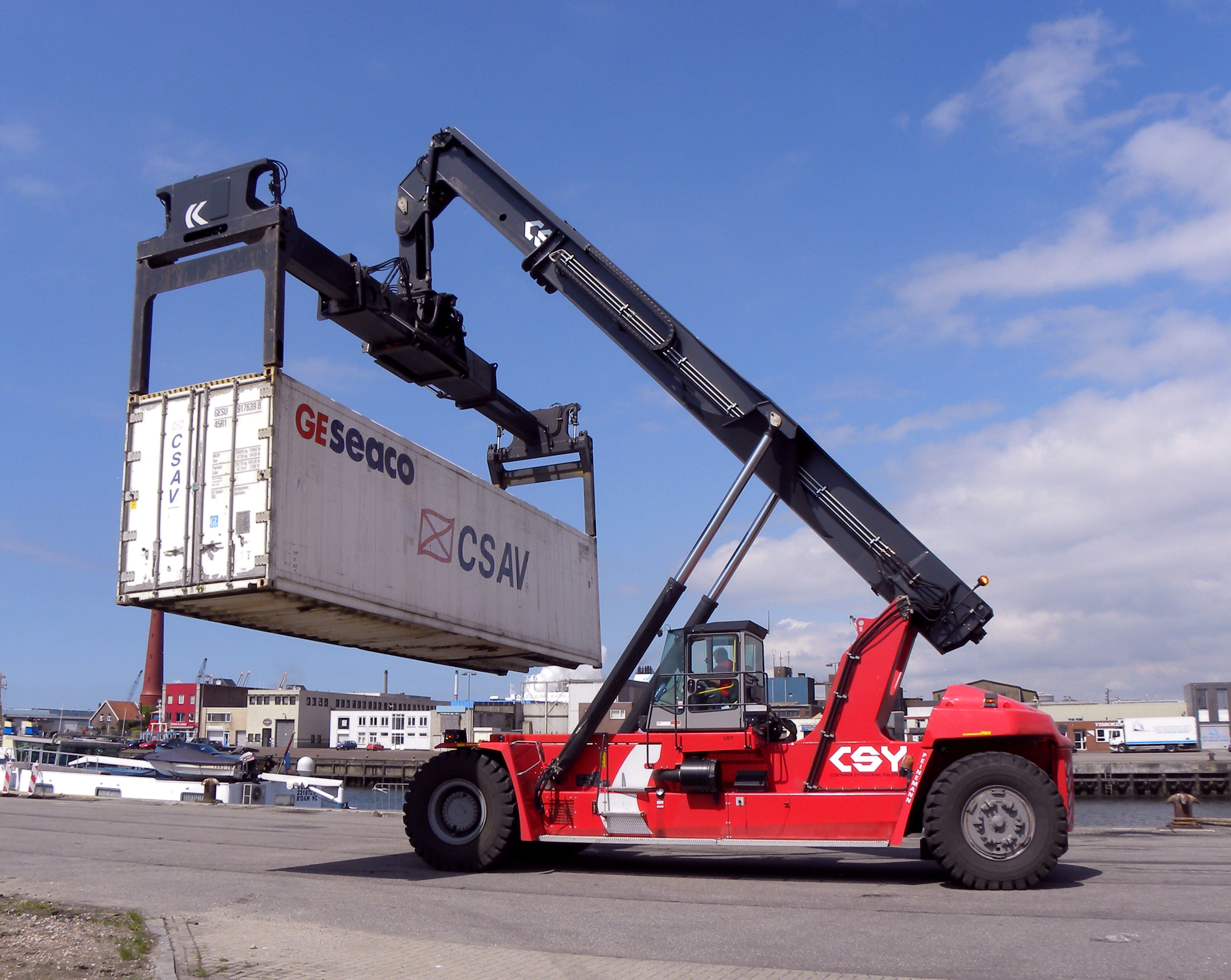
Reach stacker

A reach stacker is a vehicle used for handling intermodal cargo containers in terminals or ports. Reach stackers can transport a container short distances very quickly and pile them in various rows depending on their access.

Reach stackers have gained ground in container handling in most markets because of their flexibility and higher stacking and storage capacity when compared to forklifts. Using reach stackers, container blocks can be kept 4-deep due to second-row access.

There are also empty stackers or empty container handlers that are used only for handling empty containers quickly and efficiently.

== Gallery ==
Examples of reach stackers

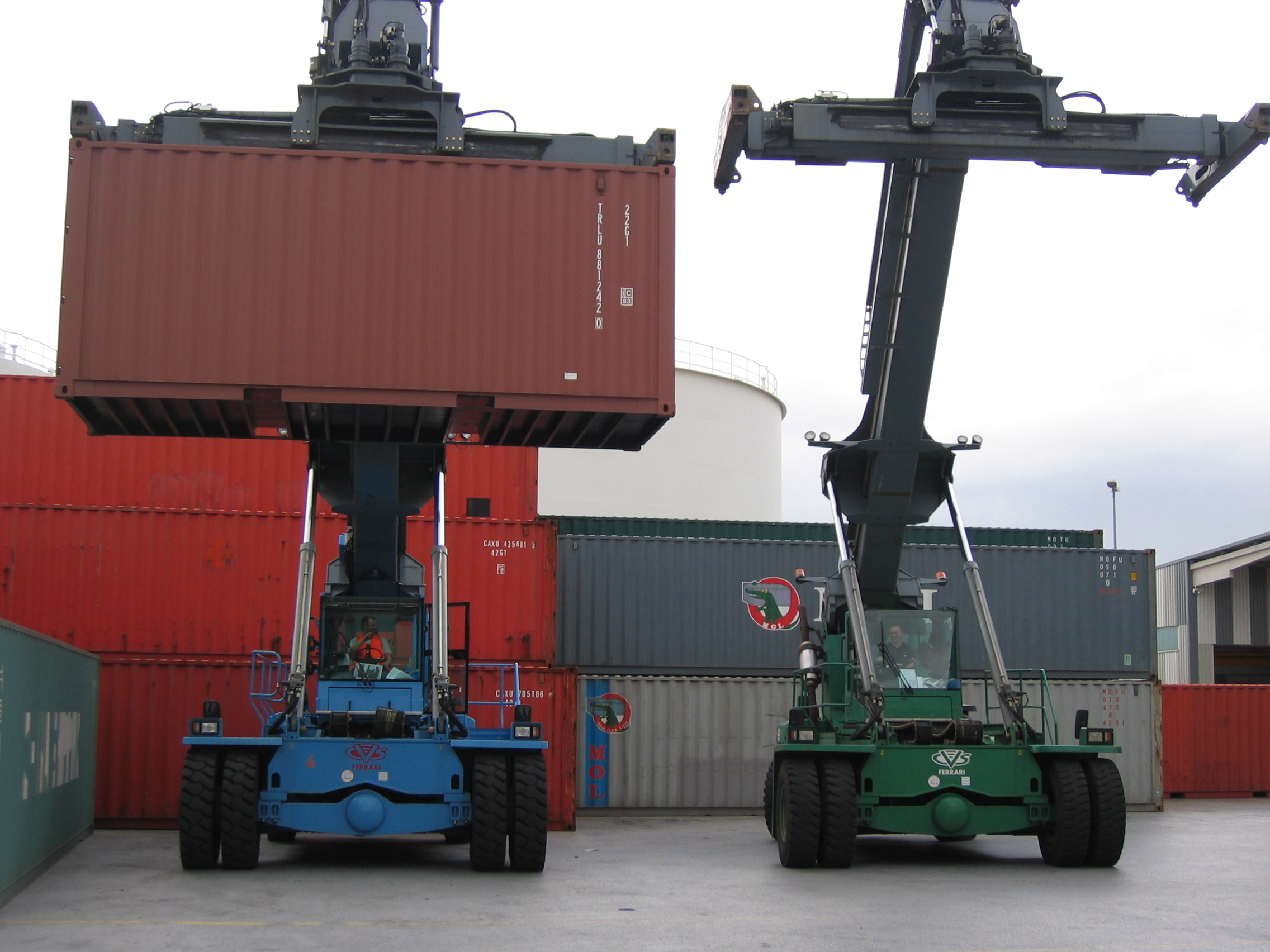
Frontal view of two reach stackers

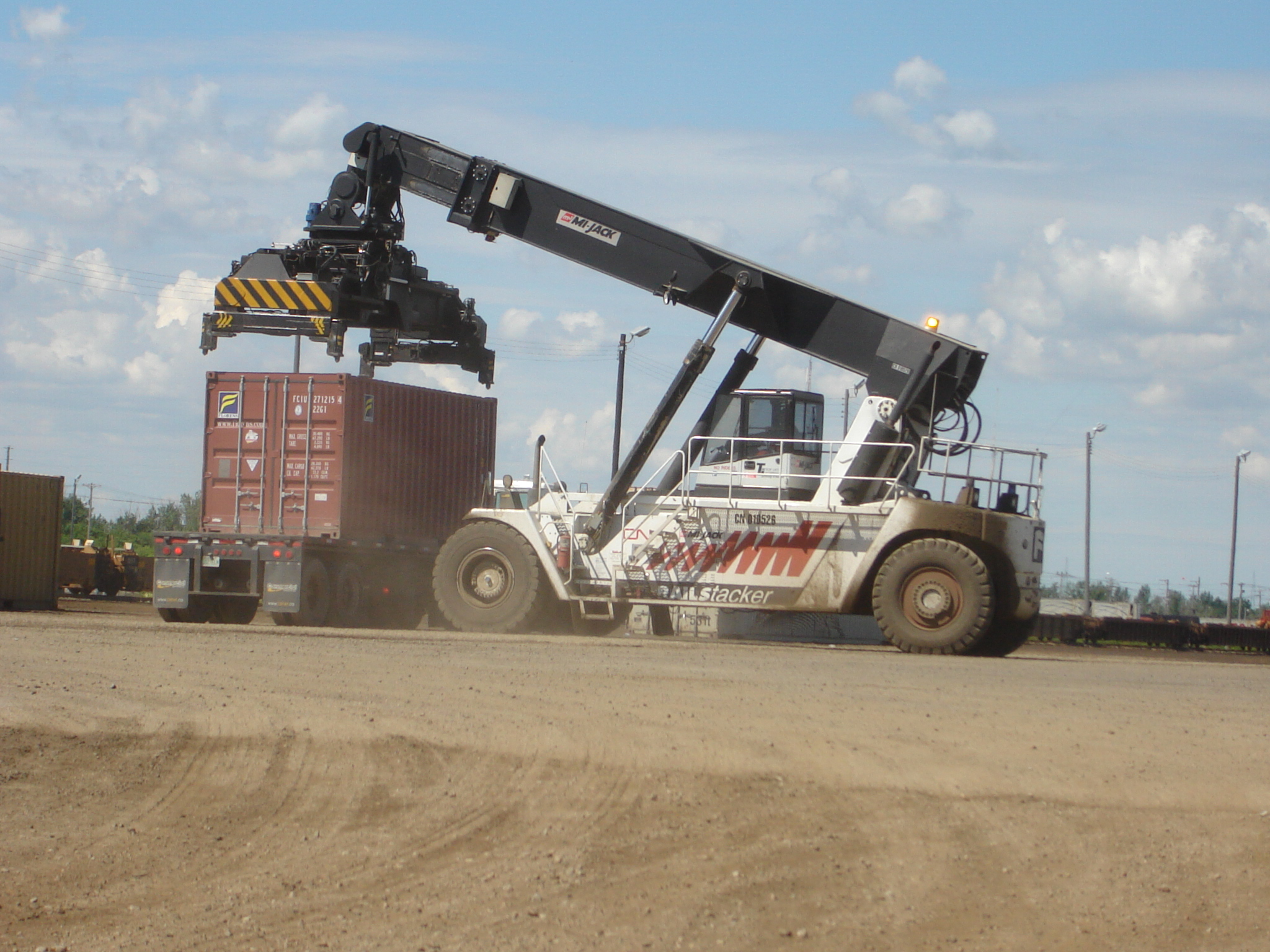
Reach stacker loading a box from freight train to truck

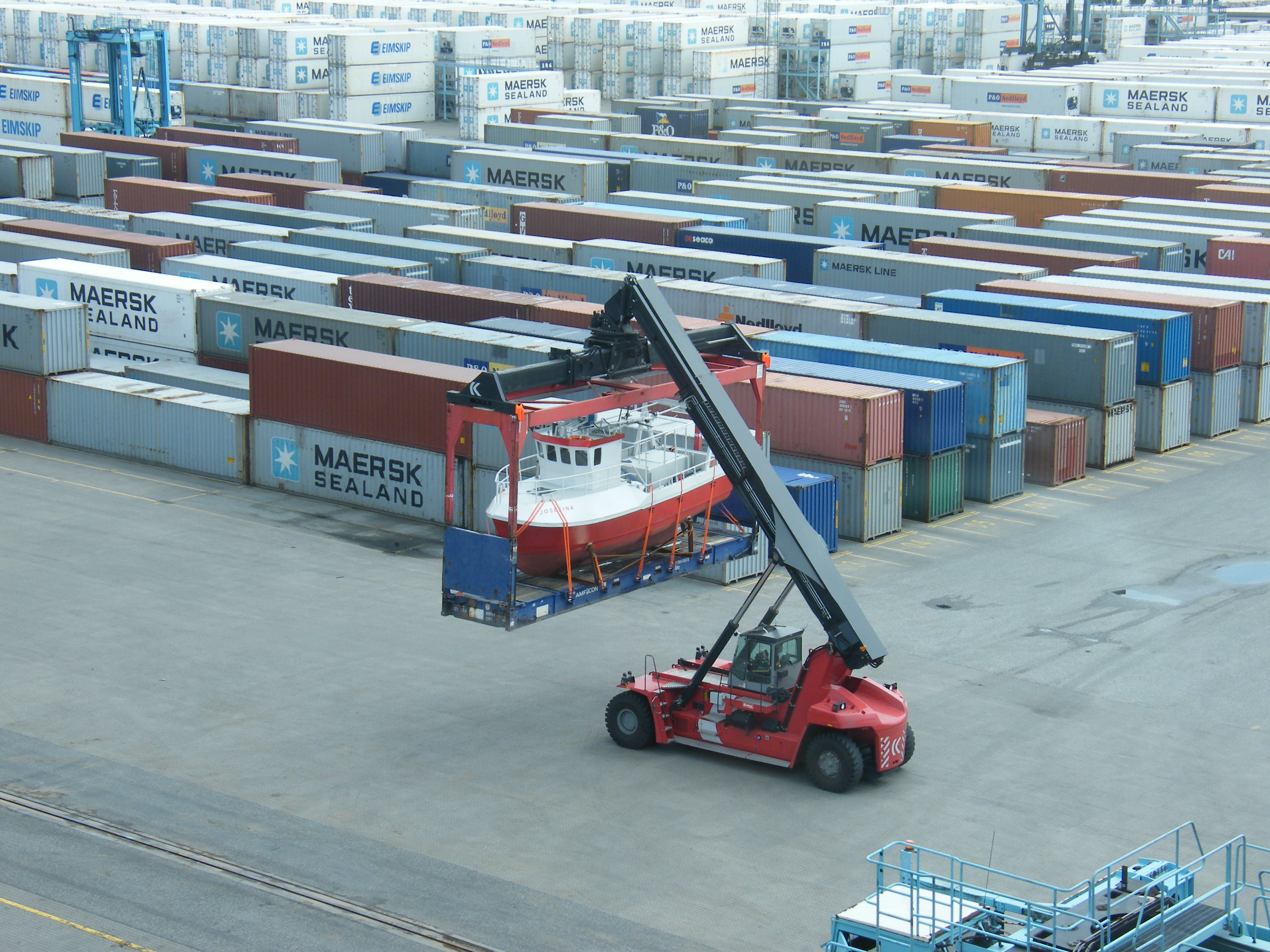
Reach stacker carrying a small vessel on a flat rack, in a container yard

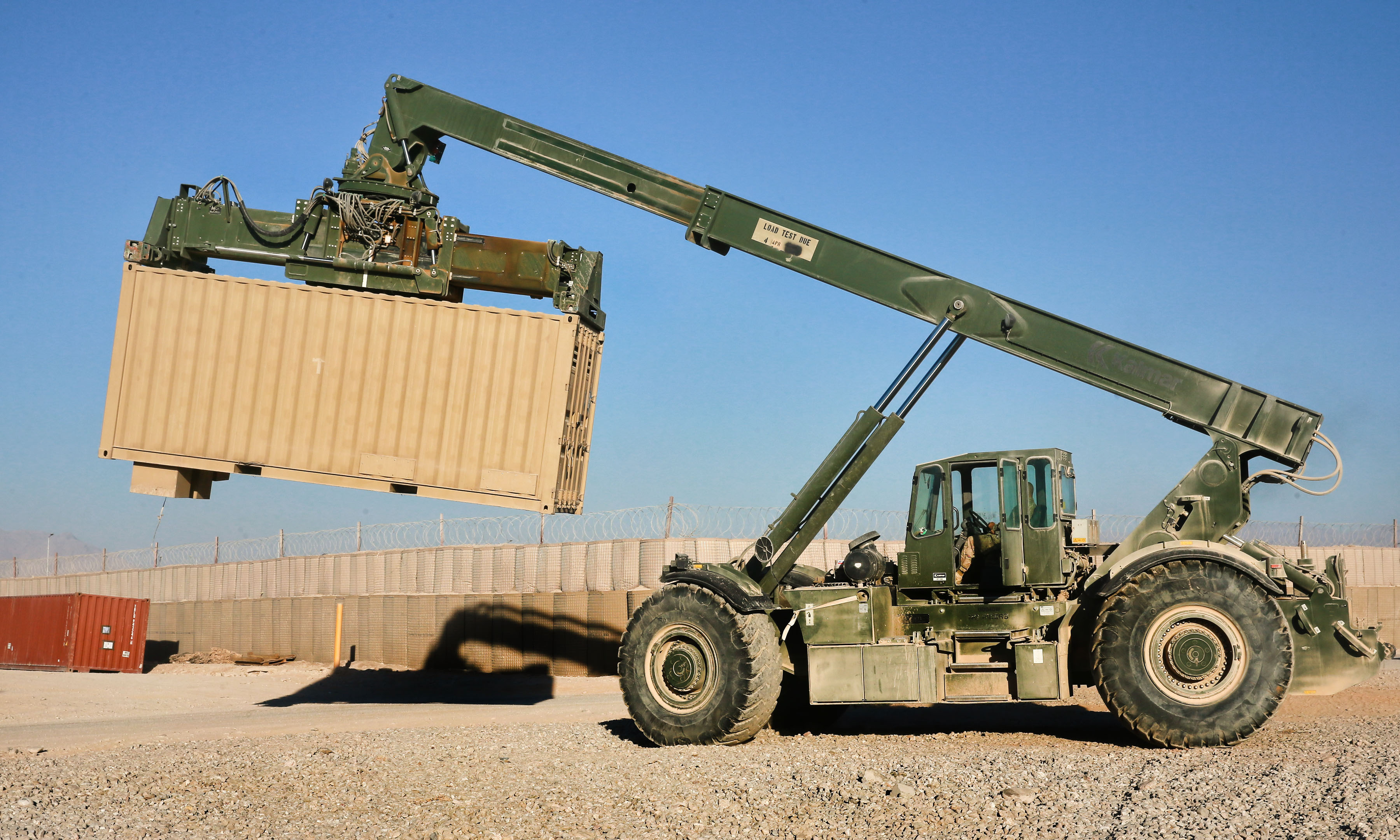
U.S. military reach stacker

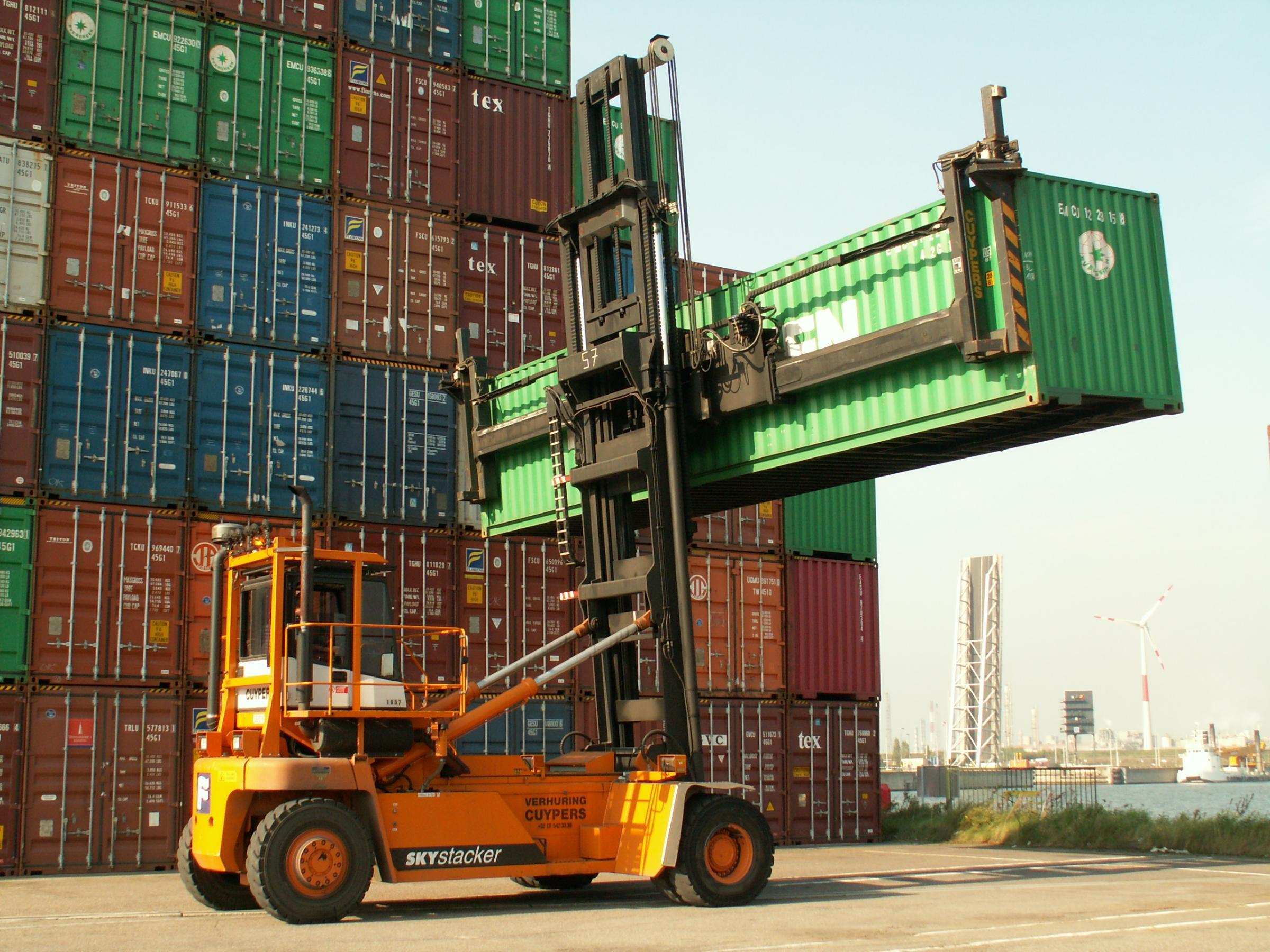
The skystacker design incorporates elements of a forklift

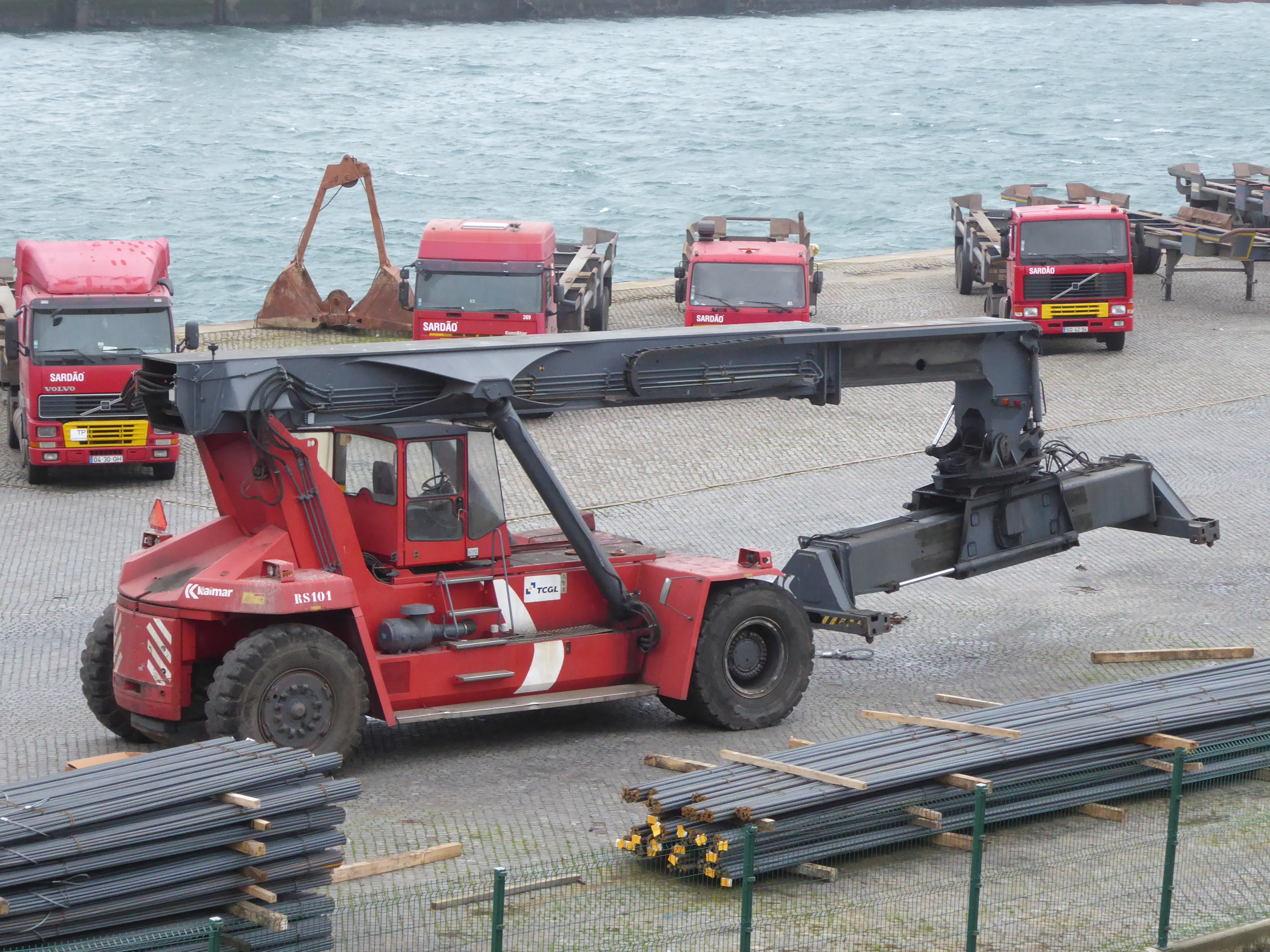
A reach stacker - container handling equipment

Reach Stackers in operation

== See also ==
- Telescopic handler
