= School science technician =

In schools, the science technician is the person who prepares the practical equipment and makes up the solutions used in school science labs. The role also includes instructing and assisting teachers with practical skills, including class demonstrations, for advanced techniques across all disciplines. Many are very well qualified and have degrees, such as a Bachelor's degree (B.A. or B.Sc), Master's degree (M.Sc.) or even a Doctorate (Dr) and/or other professional qualifications such as the HNC, HND and NVQ.

Their main duties include:

- Care of living organisms
- Making up solutions
- School science experiments and demonstrations
- Inventory
- Budget and Accounts
- Repairing and constructing laboratory equipment

In December 2002 CLEAPSS commissioned a survey into the Specific Job roles of Science Technicians. The pdf Document G228 - Technicians and their jobs which can be freely downloaded was released and later updated in 2009. The guide was written to help promote a professional technician service in schools and colleges.

== See also ==
- Science education
