= Machine operator efficiency =

In industrial engineering and lean manufacturing, machine operator efficiency (MOE) is a metric used to evaluate the performance of personnel responsible for running industrial machinery. Unlike overall equipment effectiveness (OEE), which measures the productivity of the machine itself, MOE focuses exclusively on the human element, specifically the operator's ability to minimize idle time and keep the equipment running continuously. It is typically calculated as the ratio of time spent producing parts to the total time the operator is on duty. A high MOE rating indicates that the operator effectively manages tasks such as loading and unloading workpieces, performing minor troubleshooting, and maintaining the flow of production without significant interruptions.

The efficiency of a machine operator is influenced by a combination of technical proficiency, workplace ergonomics, and standardized procedures. Comprehensive training programs that cover both equipment operation and preventive maintenance allow operators to identify and resolve minor mechanical issues before they lead to significant downtime. Additionally, the application of ergonomic principles—such as optimizing the placement of controls and ensuring proper seating—can significantly boost performance by reducing physical fatigue and the risk of musculoskeletal disorders. By implementing lean manufacturing strategies, such as the SMED (Single-Minute Exchange of Die) method to reduce changeover times, organizations can further enhance operator efficiency, leading to increased throughput and lower per-unit manufacturing costs.
