= List of military aviation occupations =

Military aviation occupations are types of work either shared with commercial aviation or unique to military aviation, all of which support an air force’s operations. Often military aviation employees will have had higher education due to the complexity of the electrical and mechanical systems involved in aircraft design and maintenance, in ground operations, in control of airspace and in the air.

== Categories ==
Military aviation occupations can be subdivided as follows:

- Military aviation engineering design

Airframe engineers
Fuel systems engineers
Instrumentation and electronics engineers
Weapon systems engineers

- Military aviation operations control (ground)

Runway design and maintenance
Aviation safety and crash recovery occupations, such as aircraft launch and recovery specialist
Air traffic control
Hangar operations
Air base operations
Air operations command

- Military aviation maintenance operations

Fleet operations
Conversion maintenance
Pre-flight, flight, and post-flight maintenance, such as fleet engineer
Fuel operations occupations
Combat operations service
Weapons service

- Military aviation flight operations

Flight crew occupations, such as military pilot and airplane navigator
Weapons crew occupations
Cargo crew occupations, such as aircraft loadmaster
Passenger crew occupations
Specialist crew occupations, such as flight surgeon

- Military aviation flight command

Air command occupations
Air control occupations
Air communications occupations
Air search occupations
Air target acquisition occupations
Air search and rescue occupations

== See also ==
- Air Force Specialty Code
