= Plant operator =

Employee who supervises an operating plant operations

Plant Operator
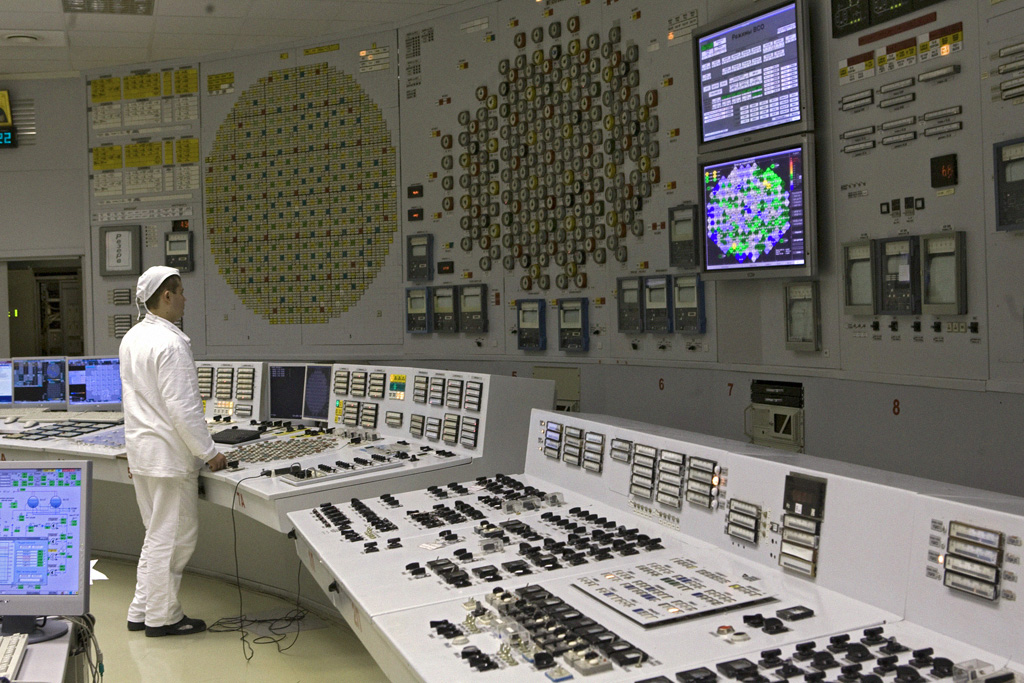
- A panel operator at work in the control room of the Leningrad Nuclear Power Plant, 2008

Occupation
- Occupation type: Semi-skilled
- Activity sectors: Chemicals; Utilities; Petroleum

Description
- Competencies: Technical and HSE knowledge and skills
- Related jobs: Stationary engineer

A plant operator is an employee who supervises the operation of an industrial plant. The term is usually applied to workers employed in utilities, wastewater treatment plants, power plants or chemical plants such as gas extraction facilities, petrochemical or oil refineries.

Modern industrial plants are generally highly automated, with control of the plant's processes centralised in a control room from which valves, gauges, alarms and switches may be operated. Employees working in these environments are sometimes known as control room, panel or board operators - conversely, workers carrying out field operations may be known as 'outside operators'. Generally, operators are assigned to a particular unit, on which they are responsible for a certain function or area of equipment. Operators are also often responsible for ensuring work is being done in a safe manner, including managing 'permit to work' systems covering other workers.

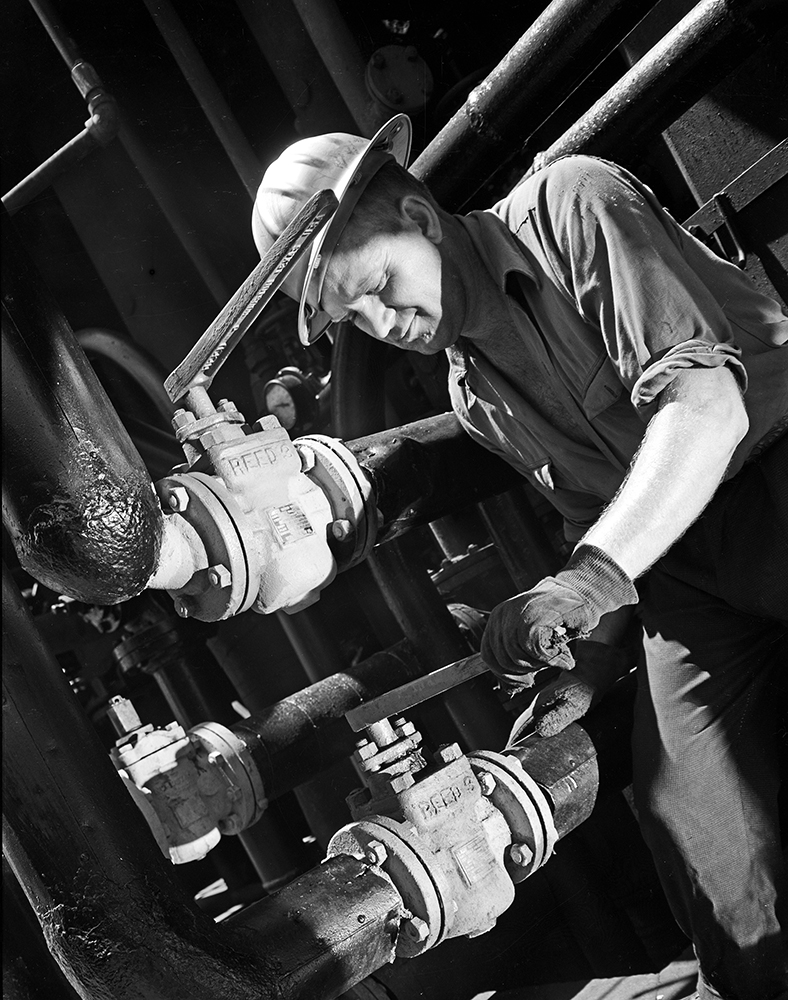
A plant operator operating a valve at the Shell Oil Company Deer Park Refinery, 1940
