= List of magazines in Ireland =

Below is a list of magazines published in Ireland.

== National ==
=== Newsstand ===
==== Arts and culture ====
- District Magazine
- Hot Press

==== General interest ====
- Dublin Review of Books
- Garda post
- Hogan Stand
- In Dublin (magazine)
- Ireland's Own
- Irish Countrysports and Country Life Magazine, Irish hunting, shooting, fishing and country lifestyle magazine
- Irish Music (magazine)
- Nós - Irish language youth and lifestyle magazine
- RTÉ Guide
- Saint Martin's Magazine
- Stellar
- Xclusive Magazine

==== Homes and interiors ====
- House and Home - bi-monthly publication
- Image Interiors & Living - bi-monthly publication

==== Military ====
- An Cosantóir - official monthly magazine of the Irish Defence Forces
- Signal - magazine of the Representative Association of Commissioned Officers (RACO)

==== Motoring ====
- Auto Trader Ireland

==== News, politics, current affairs and society ====
- An Phoblacht - magazine of Sinn Féin
- The Brandsma Review - conservative Roman Catholic magazine
- Business and Finance
- Business Plus
- eolas Magazine - public policy, politics and business magazine
- History Ireland
- Humanism Ireland
- The Irish Humanist
- Irish Political Review
- Look Left - broad left magazine published by the Workers' Party
- Saoirse Irish Freedom - monthly magazine of Republican Sinn Féin
- The Starry Plough - magazine of the Irish Republican Socialist Party
- Village - monthly political magazine

==== Other ====
- European Supermarket Magazine
- Gay Community News (GCN) - Ireland's oldest (and free) gay magazine

=== Magazine supplements to newspapers ===
- Innovation - monthly technology supplement to the Irish Times

=== Trade and professional ===
- Garda Review
- Irish Medical Times
- Plan - independent monthly architecture title

== Regional ==
- Ulster Tatler

== Defunct magazines ==
- The Beau
- The Bell
- The Camera
- Capuchin Annual
- ComputerScope
- Construct Ireland
- Dawn and Dawn Train - Irish pacifist magazines, linked with the International Fellowship of Reconciliation
- Dublin Builder
- The Dubliner (magazine)
- The Dublin Magazine
- Dublin Opinion
- Dublin University Magazine
- Envoy, A Review of Literature and Art
- Face Up (magazine)
- Film Ireland
- Foggy Notions
- Forth
- Fortnight Magazine - Northern Irish political magazine
- Gaelic Journal
- Gay Star and Upstart
- Gralton magazine - leftist magazine
- The Hibernia Magazine
- The Hibernian
- The Honest Ulsterman
- Hyphen (fanzine)
- Ireland Today
- Irish Builder
- IRIS Magazine - Irish Republican magazine
- Irish Monthly
- Irish Rosary
- Irish Statesman
- The Journal of Music
- Kiss (Irish magazine) - Pop culture
- The Klaxon
- The Lace Curtain
- The Lepracaun Cartoon Monthly
- Magill - political and cultural review
- Mongrel (magazine)
- New Ireland Review
- Official PlayStation Magazine (Ireland)
- Oghma (magazine)
- Our Boys (magazine)
- PC Live!
- The Phoenix - satirical and investigative magazine
- Rann (magazine)
- Red Patriot and Voice of Revolution - Maoist, anti-clerical, pro-Irish republican magazines published by the Communist Party of Ireland (Marxist–Leninist)
- The Ripening of Time - Marxist magazine
- Samhain (magazine)
- State (magazine)
- An tUltach
- Walker's Hibernian Magazine
