= Construction =

Process of building or assembling a building or infrastructure

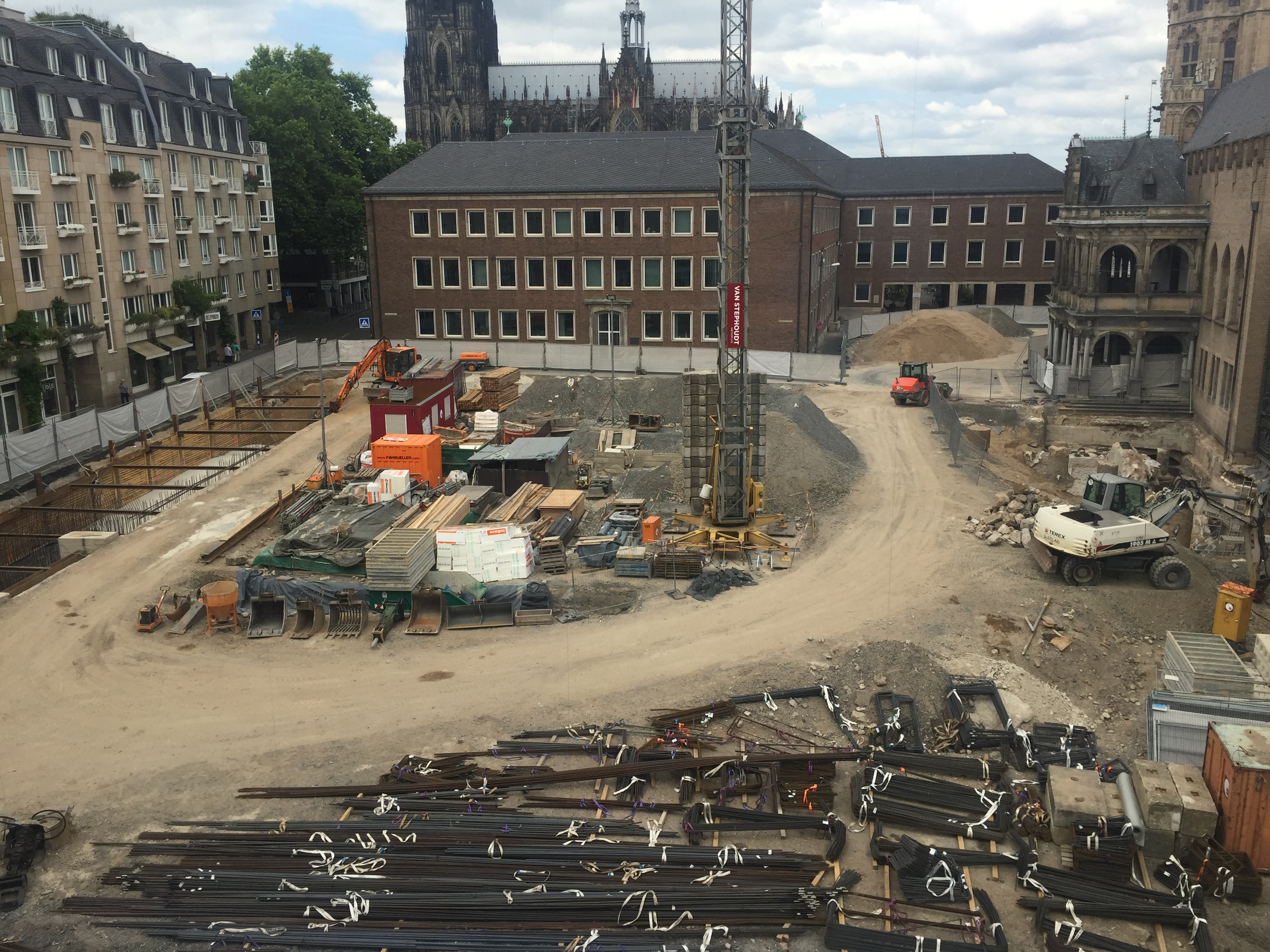
Construction site and equipment prepared for start of work in Cologne, Germany (2017)

Construction is the process involved in delivering buildings, infrastructure, industrial facilities, and associated activities through to the end of their life. It typically starts with planning, financing, and design that continues until the asset is built and ready for use. Construction also covers repairs and maintenance work, any work to expand, extend, and improve the asset, and its eventual demolition, dismantling, or decommissioning.

The construction industry contributes significantly to many countries' gross domestic products (GDP). Global expenditure on construction activities was about $4 trillion in 2012. In 2022, expenditure on the construction industry exceeded $11 trillion a year, equivalent to about 13 percent of global GDP. This spending was forecasted to rise to around $14.8 trillion in 2030.

The construction industry promotes economic development and brings many non-monetary benefits to many countries, but it is one of the most hazardous industries. For example, about 20% (1,061) of US industry fatalities in 2019 happened in construction.

Construction site in Yekaterinburg, Russia

== Etymology ==
"Construction" stems from the Latin word constructio (which comes from com- "together" and struere "to pile up") as well as Old French construction. "To construct" is a verb: the act of building. The noun is "construction": how something is built or the nature of its structure.

== History ==
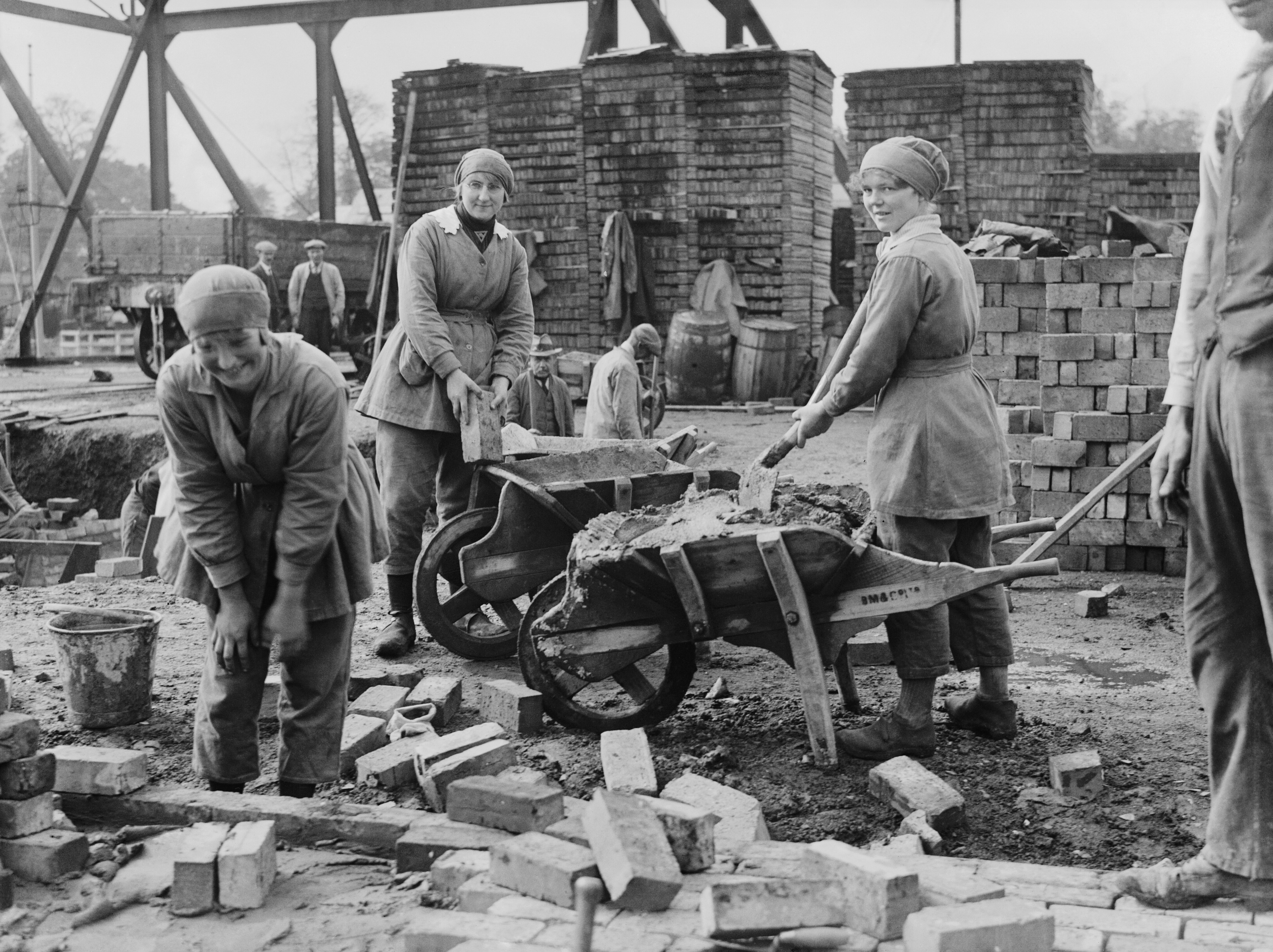
Bricklayers at work on a construction site during World War I

The first huts and shelters were constructed by hand or with simple tools. As cities grew during the Bronze Age, a class of professional craftsmen, like bricklayers and carpenters, appeared. Occasionally, slaves were used for construction work. In the Middle Ages, the artisan craftsmen were organized into craft guilds. In the 19th century, steam-powered machinery appeared, and later, diesel- and electric-powered vehicles such as cranes, excavators and bulldozers.

Fast-track construction has been increasingly popular in the 21st century. Some estimates suggest that 40% of construction projects are now fast-track construction.

== Construction industry sectors ==
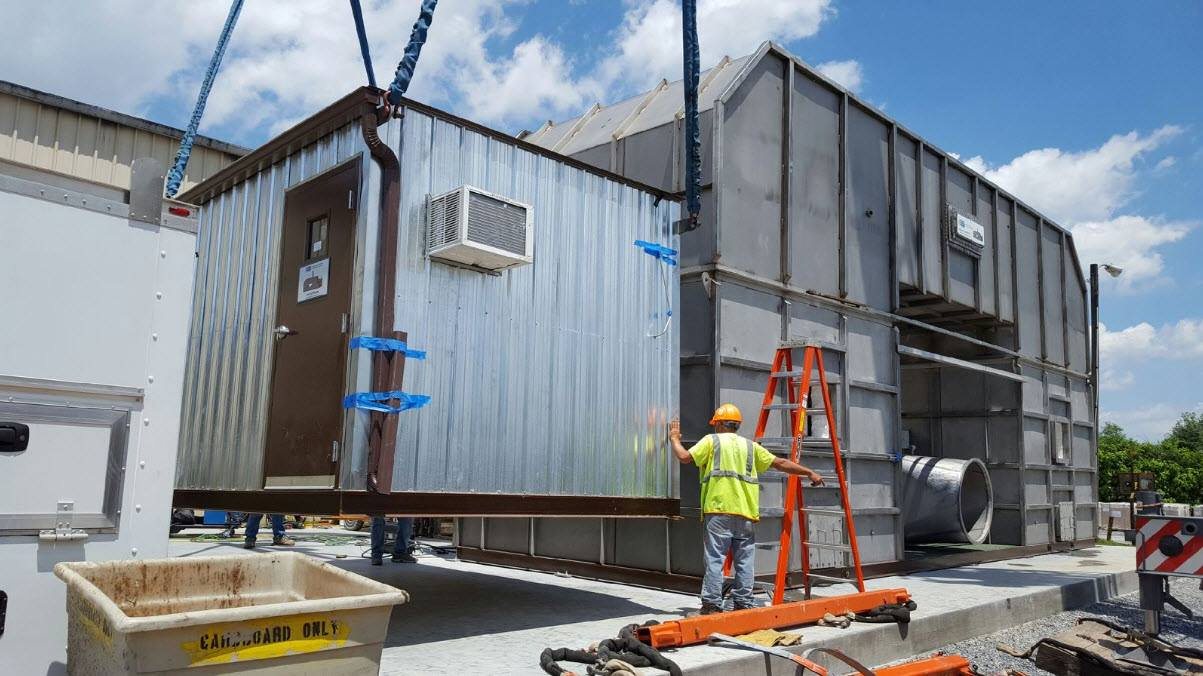
Industrial assemblage of a thermal oxidizer in the United States

Broadly, there are three sectors of construction: buildings, infrastructure and industrial:

- Building construction is usually further divided into residential and non-residential.
- Infrastructure, also called 'heavy civil' or 'heavy engineering', includes large public works, dams, bridges, highways, railways, water or wastewater and utility distribution.
- Industrial construction includes offshore construction (mainly of energy installations), mining and quarrying, refineries, chemical processing, mills and manufacturing plants.

The industry can also be classified into sectors or markets. For example, Engineering News-Record (ENR), a US-based construction trade magazine, has compiled and reported data about the size of design and construction contractors. In 2014, it split the data into nine market segments: transportation, petroleum, buildings, power, industrial, water, manufacturing, sewage/waste, telecom, hazardous waste, and a tenth category for other projects. ENR used data on transportation, sewage, hazardous waste and water to rank firms as heavy contractors.

The Standard Industrial Classification and the newer North American Industry Classification System classify companies that perform or engage in construction into three subsectors: building construction, heavy and civil engineering construction, and specialty trade contractors. There are also categories for professional services firms (e.g., engineering, architecture, surveying, project management).

=== Building construction ===
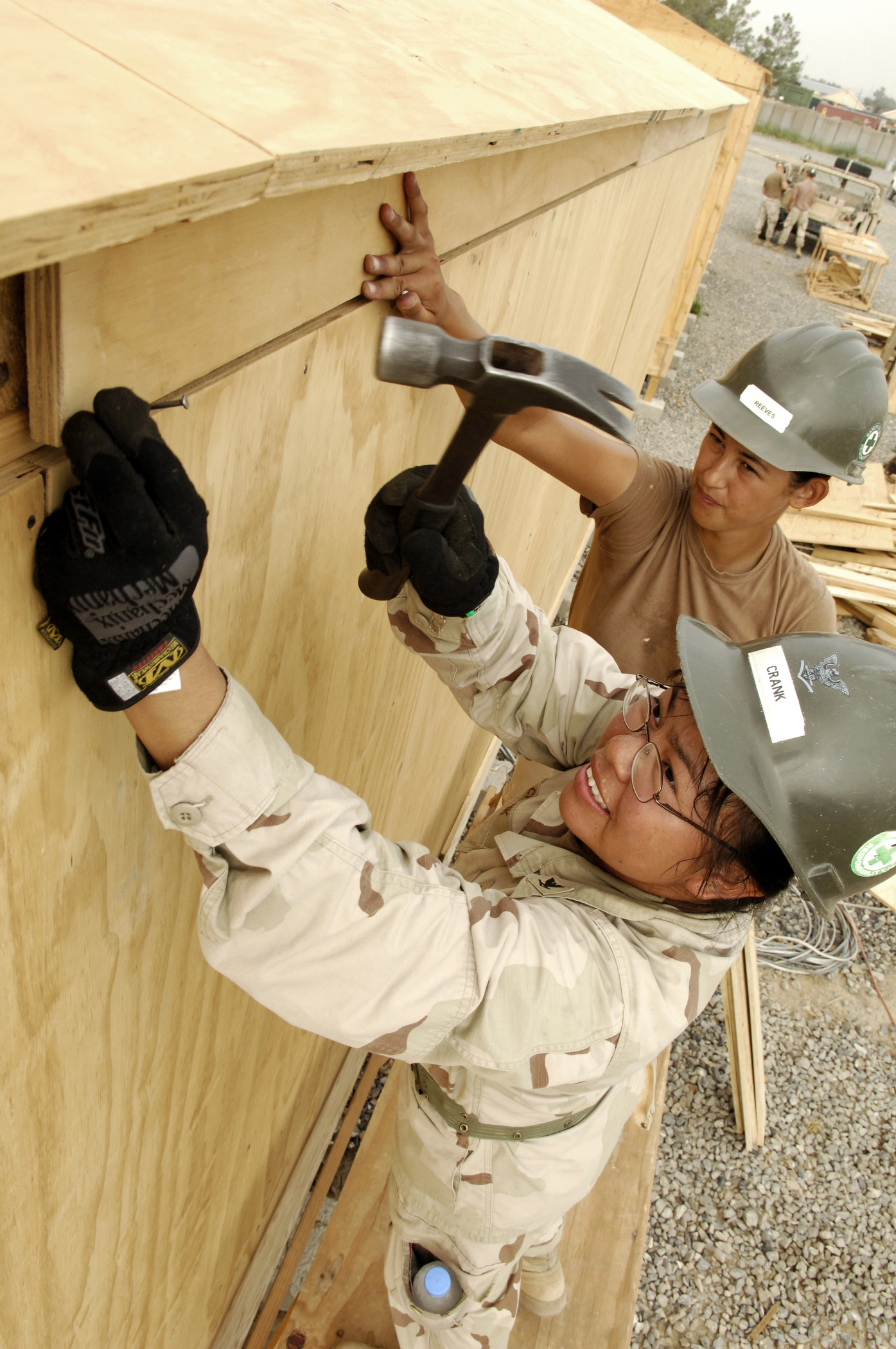
Military residential unit construction by U.S. Navy personnel in Afghanistan

Building construction is the process of adding structures to areas of land, also known as real property sites. Typically, a project is instigated by or with the owner of the property (who may be an individual or an organisation); occasionally, land may be compulsorily purchased from the owner for public use.

==== Residential construction ====
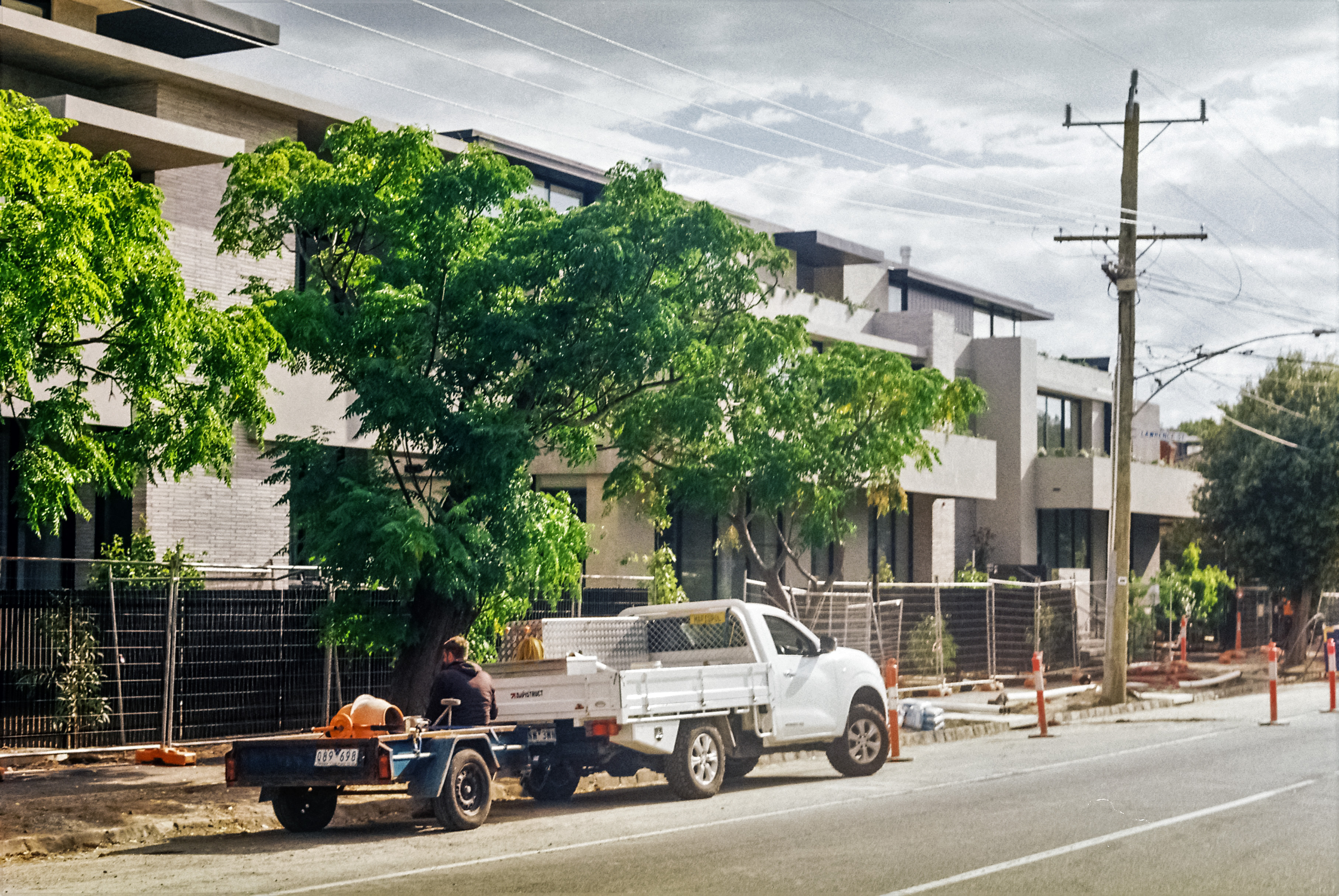
Units under construction in Brighton, Victoria, Australia

Residential construction may be undertaken by individual land-owners (self-built), by specialist housebuilders, by property developers, by general contractors, or by providers of public or social housing (e.g.: local authorities, housing associations). Where local zoning or planning policies allow, mixed-use developments may comprise both residential and non-residential construction (e.g.: retail, leisure, offices, public buildings, etc.).

Residential construction practices, technologies, and resources must conform to local building authority's regulations and codes of practice. Materials readily available in the area generally dictate the construction materials used (e.g.: brick versus stone versus timber). Costs of construction on a per square meter (or per square foot) basis for houses can vary dramatically based on site conditions, access routes, local regulations, economies of scale (custom-designed homes are often more expensive to build) and the availability of skilled tradespeople.

==== Non-residential construction ====
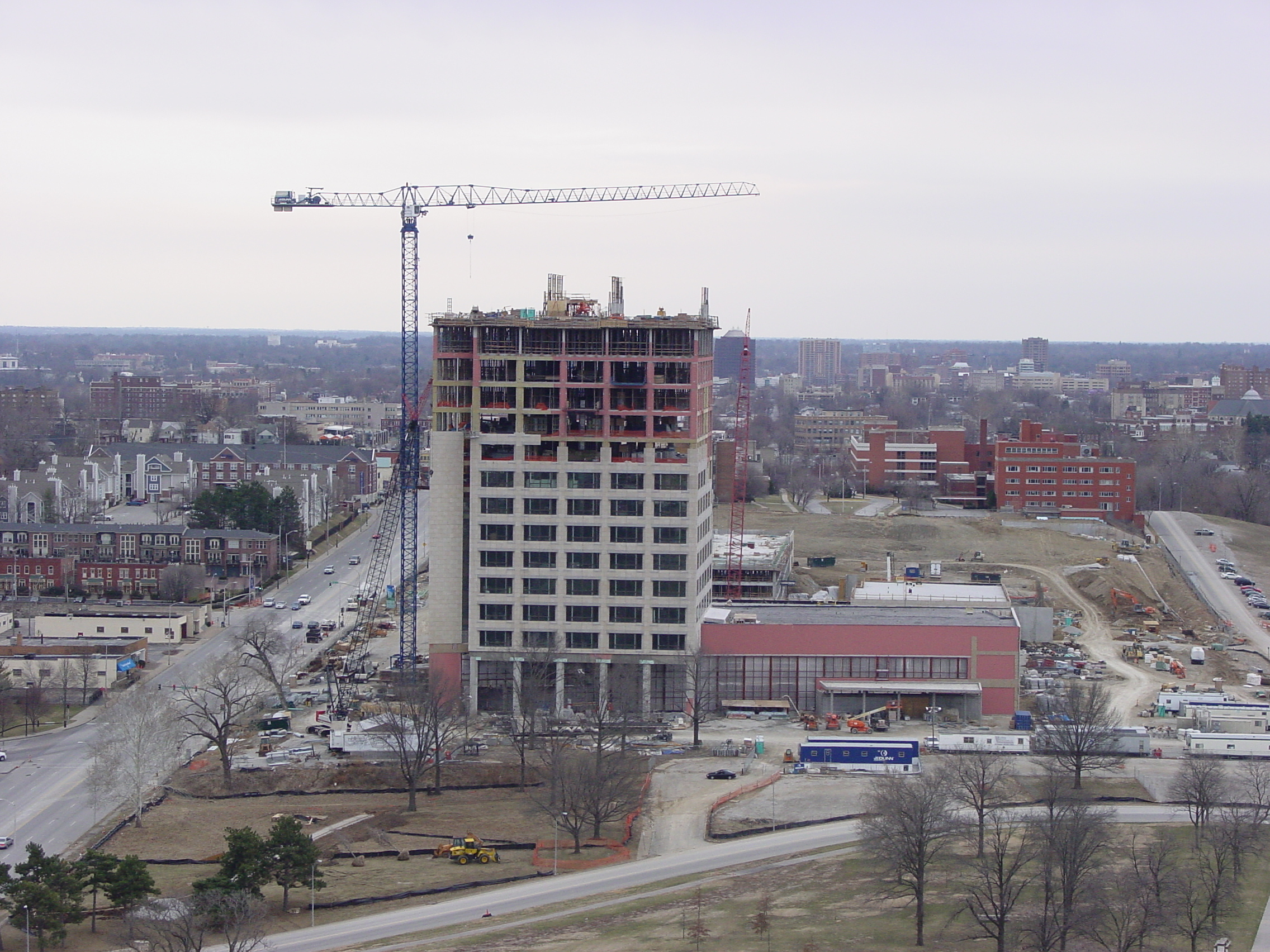
Construction of the Federal Reserve building in Kansas City, Missouri

Depending upon the type of building, non-residential building construction can be procured by a wide range of private and public organisations, including local authorities, educational and religious bodies, transport undertakings, retailers, hoteliers, property developers, financial institutions and other private companies. Most construction in these sectors is undertaken by general contractors.

=== Infrastructure construction ===
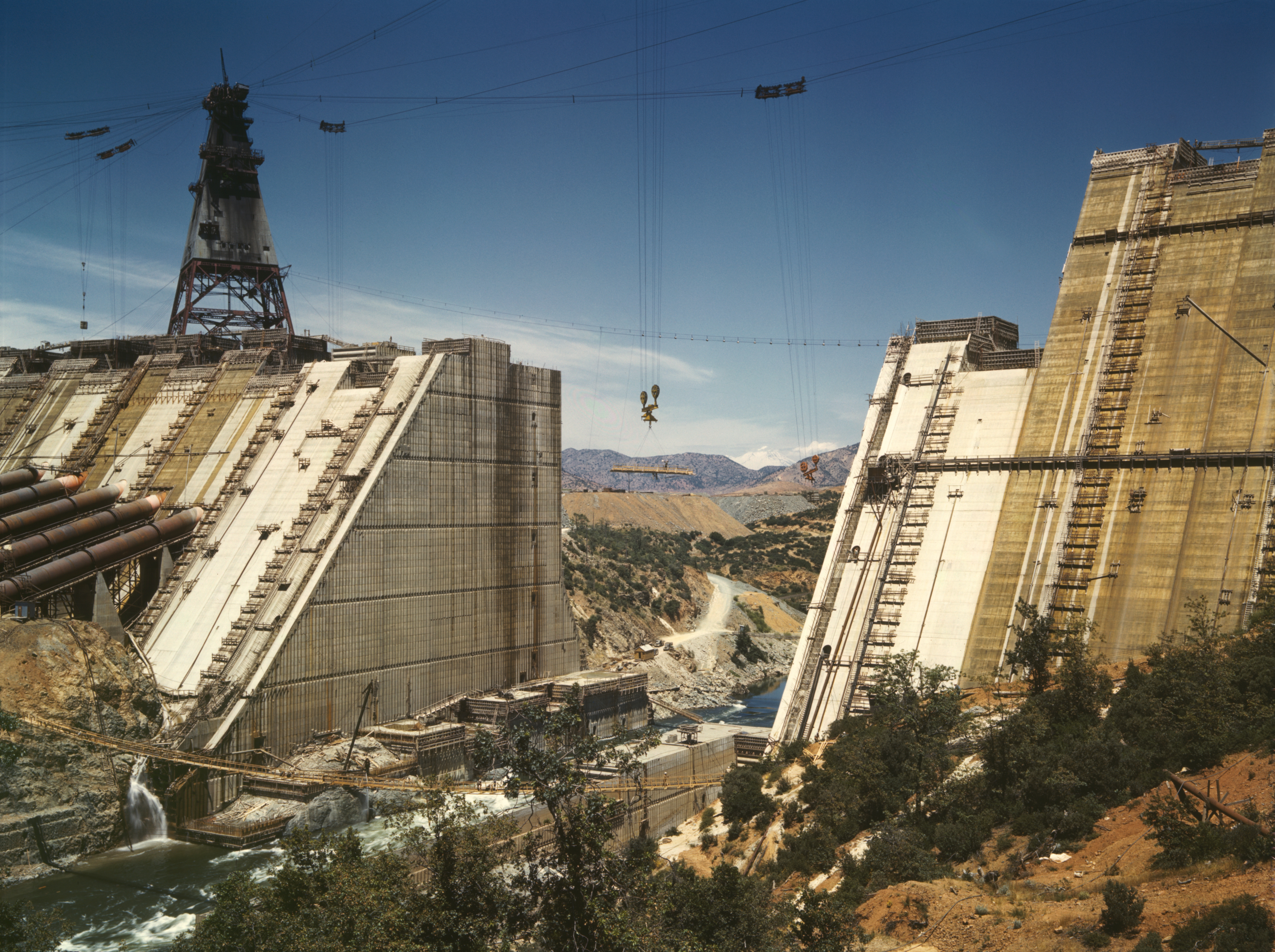
Shasta Dam under construction in June 1942

Civil engineering covers the design, construction, and maintenance of the physical and naturally built environment, including public works such as roads, bridges, canals, dams, tunnels, airports, water and sewerage systems, pipelines, and railways. Some general contractors have expertise in civil engineering; civil engineering contractors are firms dedicated to work in this sector, and may specialise in particular types of infrastructure.

=== Industrial construction ===
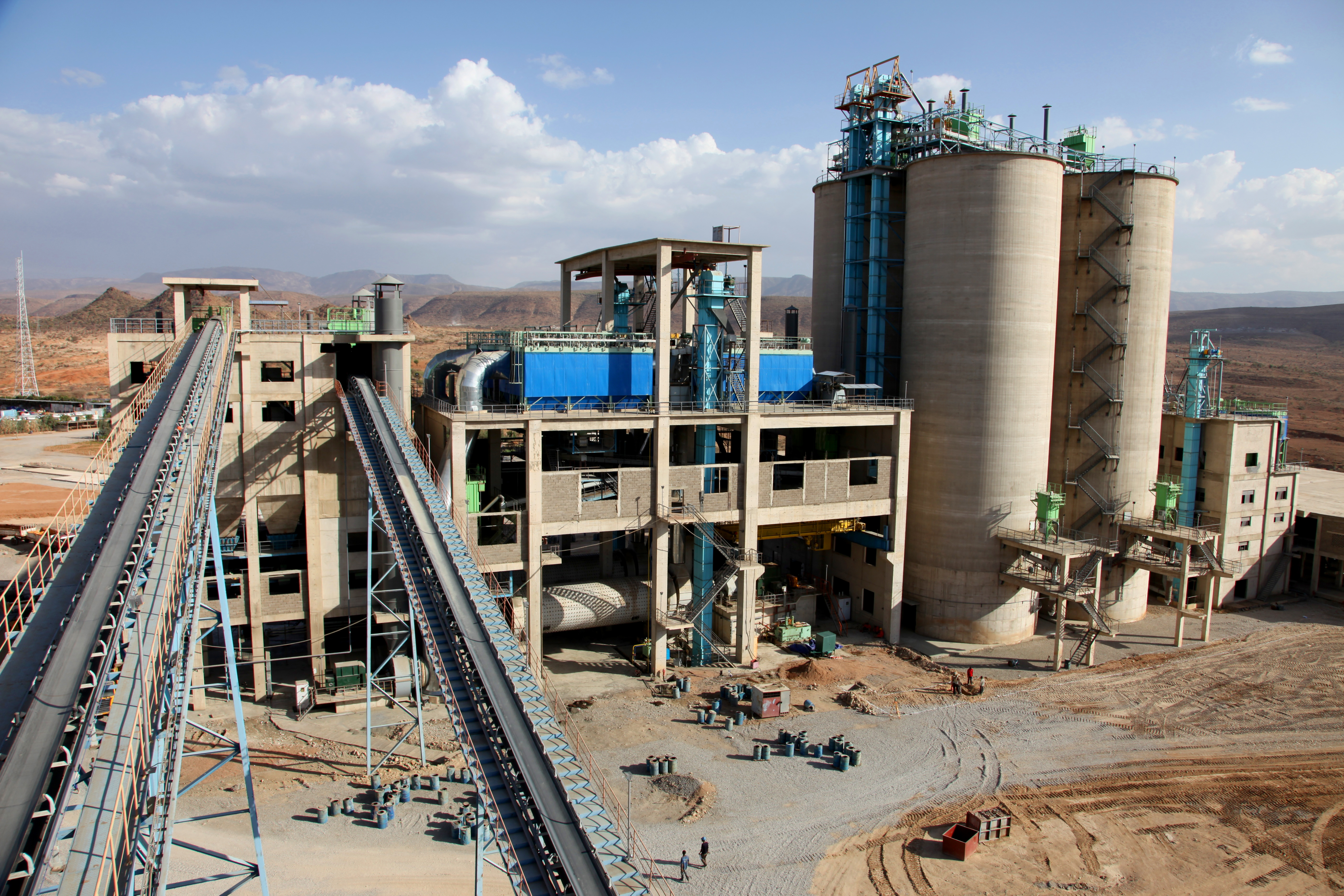
The National Cement Share Company of Ethiopia's new plant in Dire Dawa

Industrial construction includes offshore construction (mainly of energy installations: oil and gas platforms, wind power), mining and quarrying, refineries, food processing plants, breweries and distilleries, power stations, steel mills, warehouses and factories.

== Construction processes ==
Some construction projects are small renovations or repair jobs, like repainting or fixing leaks, where the owner may act as designer, paymaster and labourer for the entire project. However, more complex or ambitious projects usually require additional multi-disciplinary expertise and manpower, so the owner may commission one or more specialist businesses to undertake detailed planning, design, construction and handover of the work. Often the owner will appoint one business to oversee the project (this may be a designer, a contractor, a construction manager, or other advisors); such specialists are normally appointed for their expertise in project delivery and construction management and will help the owner define the project brief, agree on a budget and schedule, liaise with relevant public authorities, and procure materials and the services of other specialists (the supply chain, comprising subcontractors and materials suppliers). Contracts are agreed for the delivery of services by all businesses, alongside other detailed plans aimed at ensuring legal, timely, on-budget and safe delivery of the specified works.

Design, finance, and legal aspects overlap and interrelate. The design must be not only structurally sound and appropriate for the use and location, but must also be financially possible to build, and legal to use. The financial structure must be adequate to build the design provided and must pay amounts that are legally owed. Legal structures integrate design with other activities and enforce financial and other construction processes.

These processes also affect procurement strategies. Clients may, for example, appoint a business to design the project, after which a competitive process is undertaken to appoint a lead contractor to construct the asset (design–bid–build); they may appoint a business to lead both design and construction (design-build); or they may directly appoint a designer, contractor and specialist subcontractors (construction management). Some forms of procurement emphasize collaborative relationships (partnering, alliancing) between the client, the contractor, and other stakeholders within a construction project, seeking to ameliorate often highly competitive and adversarial industry practices. DfMA (design for manufacture and assembly) and so-called modern methods of construction approaches also emphasize early collaboration with manufacturers and suppliers regarding products and components.

Construction or refurbishment work in a "live" environment (where residents or businesses remain living in or operating on the site) requires particular care, planning and communication.

=== Planning ===
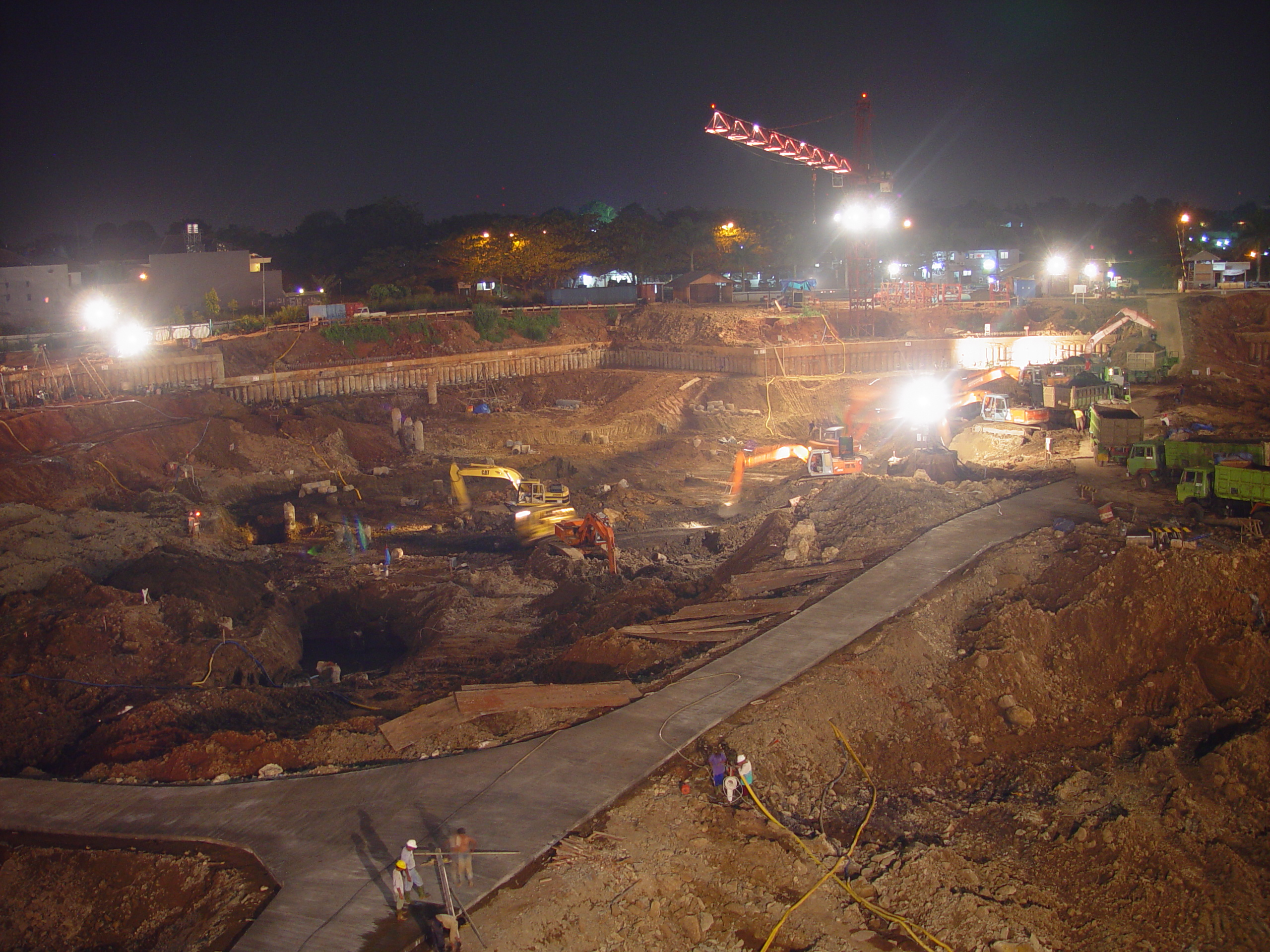
Digging the foundation for a building construction in Jakarta, Indonesia

When applicable, a proposed construction project must comply with local land-use planning policies including zoning and building code requirements. A project will normally be assessed (by the 'authority having jurisdiction', AHJ, typically the municipality where the project will be located) for its potential impacts on neighbouring properties, and upon existing infrastructure (transportation, social infrastructure, and utilities including water supply, sewerage, electricity, telecommunications, etc.). Data may be gathered through site analysis, site surveys and geotechnical investigations. Construction normally cannot start until planning permission has been granted, and may require preparatory work to ensure relevant infrastructure has been upgraded before building work can commence. Preparatory works will also include surveys of existing utility lines to avoid damage-causing outages and other hazardous situations.

Some legal requirements come from malum in se considerations, or the desire to prevent indisputably bad phenomena, e.g. explosions or bridge collapses. Other legal requirements come from malum prohibitum considerations, or factors that are a matter of custom or expectation, such as isolating businesses from a business district or residences from a residential district. An attorney may seek changes or exemptions in the law that governs the land where the building will be built, either by arguing that a rule is inapplicable (the bridge design will not cause a collapse), or that the custom is no longer needed (acceptance of live-work spaces has grown in the community).

During the construction of a building, a municipal building inspector usually inspects the ongoing work periodically to ensure that construction adheres to the approved plans and the local building code. Once construction is complete, any later changes made to a building or other asset that affect safety, including its use, expansion, structural integrity, and fire protection, usually require municipality approval.

=== Finance ===
Depending on the type of project, mortgage bankers, accountants, and cost engineers may participate in creating an overall plan for the financial management of a construction project. The presence of the mortgage banker is highly likely, even in relatively small projects since the owner's equity in the property is the most obvious source of funding for a building project. Accountants act to study the expected monetary flow over the life of the project and to monitor the payouts throughout the process. Professionals including cost engineers, estimators and quantity surveyors apply expertise to relate the work and materials involved to a proper valuation.

Financial planning ensures adequate safeguards and contingency plans are in place before the project is started, and ensures that the plan is properly executed over the life of the project. Construction projects can suffer from preventable financial problems. Underbids happen when builders ask for too little money to complete the project. Cash flow problems exist when the present amount of funding cannot cover the current costs for labour and materials; such problems may arise even when the overall budget is adequate, presenting a temporary issue. Cost overruns with government projects have occurred when the contractor identified change orders or project changes that increased costs, which are not subject to competition from other firms as they have already been eliminated from consideration after the initial bid. Fraud is also an issue of growing significance within construction.

Large projects can involve highly complex financial plans and often start with a conceptual cost estimate performed by a building estimator. As portions of a project are completed, they may be sold, supplanting one lender or owner for another, while the logistical requirements of having the right trades and materials available for each stage of the building construction project carry forward. Public–private partnerships (PPPs) or private finance initiatives (PFIs) may also be used to help deliver major projects. According to McKinsey in 2019, the "vast majority of large construction projects go over budget and take 20% longer than expected".

=== Legal ===
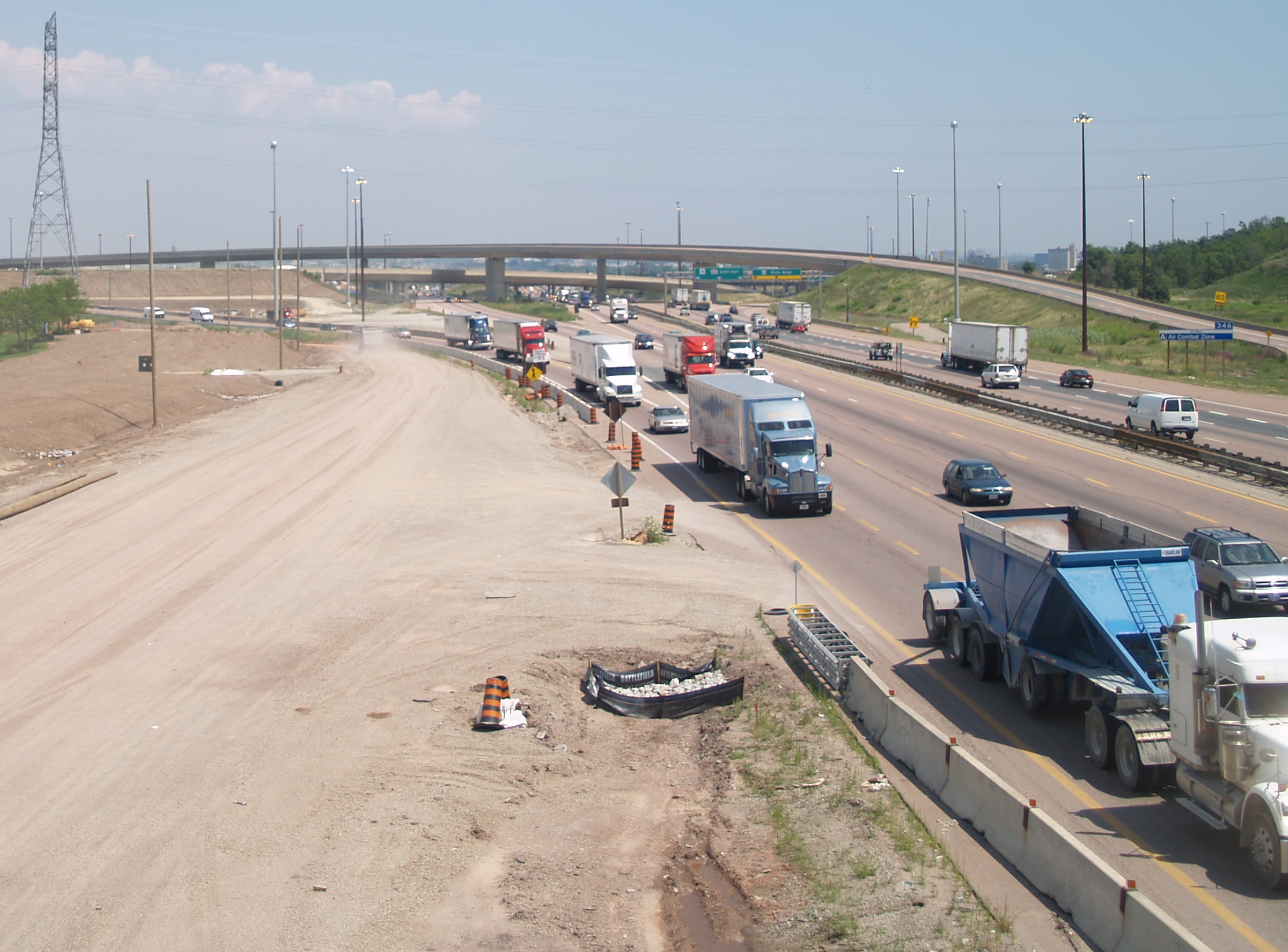
Construction along Ontario Highway 401, widening the road from six to twelve travel lanes

Law related to construction primarily focuses around contracts and obligations, as well as planning permissions and legal matters on topics such as infrastructure, housing, engineering, insurance, the environment and building warrants. A construction project is a complex net of construction contracts and other legal obligations, each of which all parties must carefully consider. A contract is the exchange of a set of obligations between two or more parties, and provides structures to manage issues. For example, construction delays can be costly, so construction contracts set out clear expectations and clear paths to manage delays. Poorly drafted contracts can lead to confusion and costly disputes. At the start of a project, legal advisors seek to identify ambiguities and other potential sources of trouble in the contract structures, and to present options for preventing problems. During projects, they work to avoid and resolve conflicts that arise and processes such as negotiation and arbitration may take place.

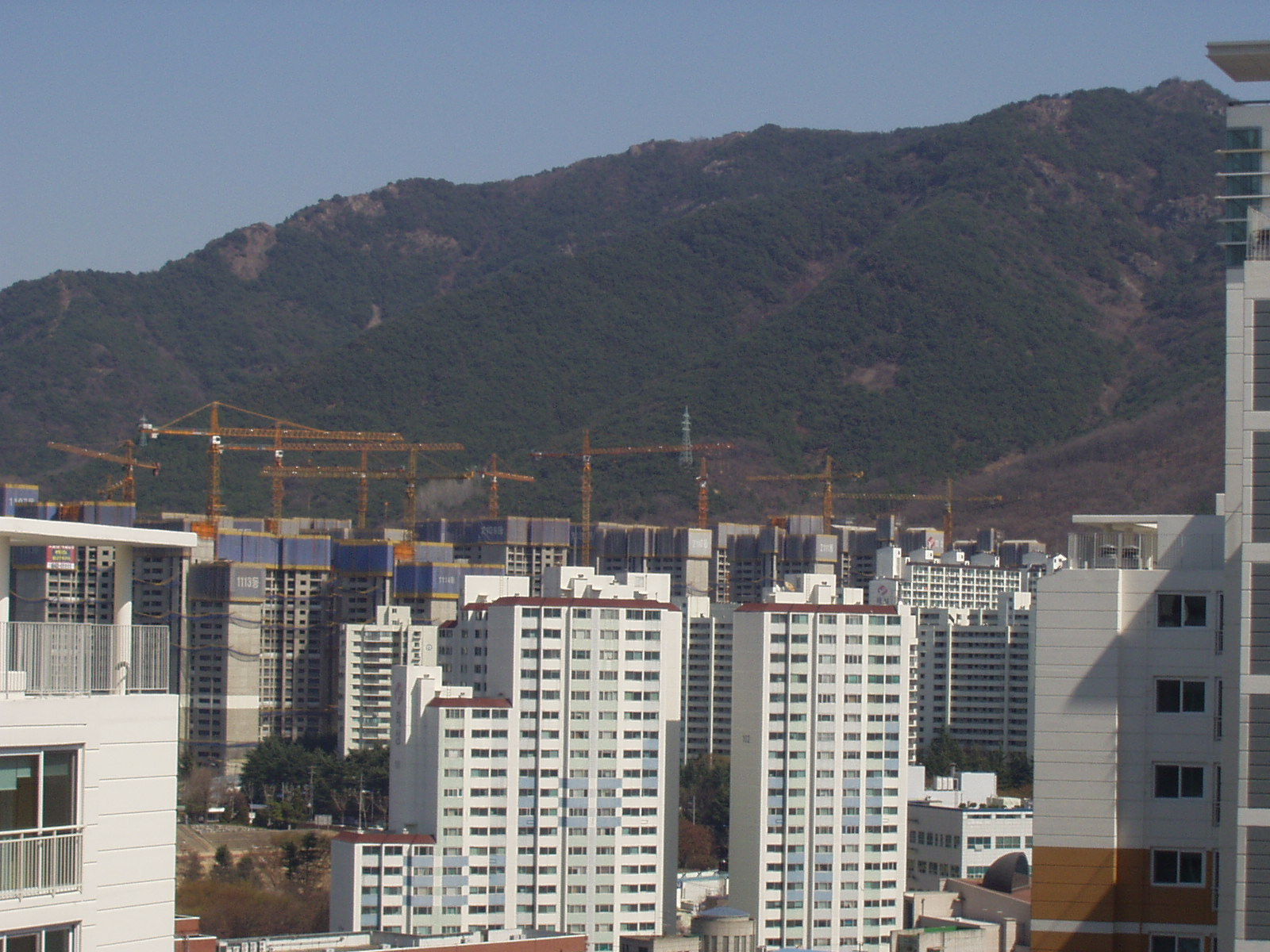
Apartment complex under construction in Daegu, South Korea

=== Procurement ===
==== Traditional or design-bid-build ====
Design-bid-build is the most common and well-established method of construction procurement. In this arrangement, the architect, engineer or builder acts for the client as the project coordinator. They design the works, prepare specifications and design deliverables (models, drawings, etc.), administer the contract, tender the works, and manage the works from inception to completion. In parallel, there are direct contractual links between the client and the main contractor, who, in turn, has direct contractual relationships with subcontractors. The arrangement continues until the project is ready for handover.

==== Design-build ====
Design-build became more common from the late 20th century, and involves the client contracting a single entity to provide design and construction. In some cases, the design-build package can also include finding the site, arranging funding and applying for all necessary statutory consents. Typically, the client invites several Design & Build (D&B) contractors to submit proposals to meet the project brief and then selects a preferred supplier. Often this will be a consortium involving a design firm and a contractor (sometimes more than one of each). In the United States, departments of transportation usually use design-build contracts as a way of progressing projects where states lack the skills or resources, particularly for very large projects.

==== Construction management ====
In a construction management arrangement, the client enters into separate contracts with the designer (architect or engineer), a construction manager, and individual trade contractors. The client takes on the contractual role, while the construction or project manager provides the active role of managing the separate trade contracts, and ensuring that they complete all work smoothly and effectively together. This approach is often used to speed up procurement processes, to allow the client greater flexibility in design variation throughout the contract, to enable the appointment of individual work contractors, to separate contractual responsibility on each individual throughout the contract, and to provide greater client control.

=== Design ===
In the industrialized world, construction usually involves the translation of designs into reality. Most commonly (i.e.: in a design-bid-build project), the design team is employed by (i.e. in contract with) the property owner. Depending upon the type of project, a design team may include architects, civil engineers, mechanical engineers, electrical engineers, structural engineers, fire protection engineers, planning consultants, architectural consultants, and archaeological consultants. A 'lead designer' will normally be identified to help coordinate different disciplinary inputs to the overall design. This may be aided by integration of previously separate disciplines (often undertaken by separate firms) into multi-disciplinary firms with experts from all related fields, or by firms establishing relationships to support design-build processes.

The increasing complexity of construction projects creates the need for design professionals trained in all phases of a project's life-cycle and develop an appreciation of the asset as an advanced technological system requiring close integration of many sub-systems and their individual components, including sustainability. For buildings, building engineering is an emerging discipline that attempts to meet this new challenge.

Traditionally, design has involved the production of sketches, architectural and engineering drawings, and specifications. Until the late 20th century, drawings were largely hand-drafted; adoption of computer-aided design (CAD) technologies then improved design productivity, while the 21st-century introduction of building information modeling (BIM) processes has involved the use of computer-generated models that can be used in their own right or to generate drawings and other visualisations as well as capturing non-geometric data about building components and systems.

On some projects, work on-site will not start until design work is largely complete; on others, some design work may be undertaken concurrently with the early stages of on-site activity (for example, work on a building's foundations may commence while designers are still working on the detailed designs of the building's internal spaces). Some projects may include elements that are designed for off-site construction (see also DfMA, prefabrication and modular building) and are then delivered to the site ready for erection, installation or assembly.

=== On-site construction ===
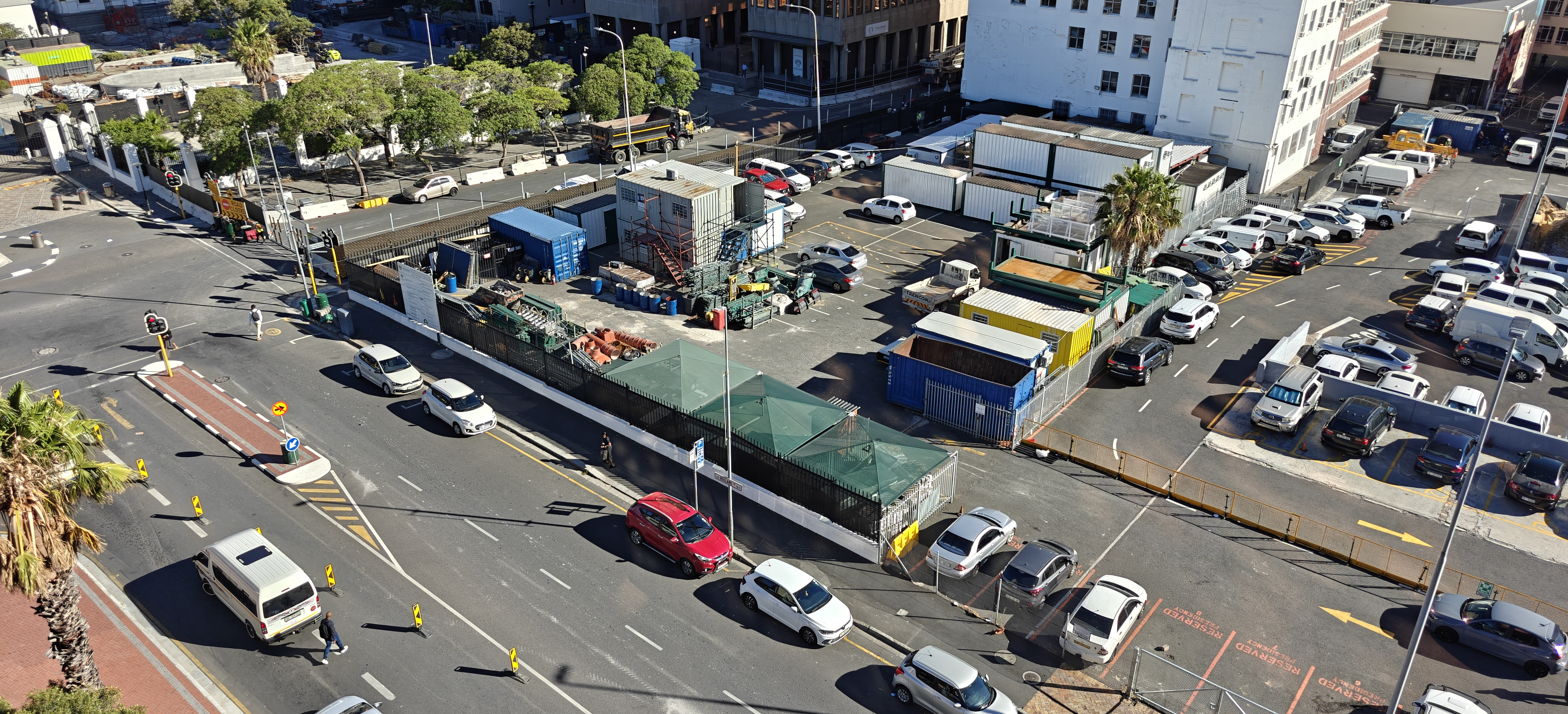
Construction storage site with shipping containers, for the rebuilding of the Houses of Parliament in Cape Town CBD

On-site foundation construction

Once contractors and other relevant professionals have been appointed and designs are sufficiently advanced, work may commence on the project site. Some projects require preliminary works, such as land preparation and levelling, demolition of existing structures (see below), or laying foundations, and there are circumstances where this work may be contracted for in advance of finalising the contract and costs for the whole project.

Typically, a construction site will include a secure perimeter to restrict unauthorised access, site access control points, office and welfare accommodation for personnel from the main contractor and other firms involved in the project team, and storage areas for materials, machinery and equipment. According to the McGraw-Hill Dictionary of Architecture and Construction's definition, construction may be said to have started when the first feature of the permanent structure has been put in place, such as pile driving, or the pouring of slabs or footings.

=== Commissioning and handover ===
Commissioning is the process of verifying that all subsystems of a new building (or other assets) work as intended to achieve the owner's project requirements and as designed by the project's architects and engineers.

=== Defects liability period ===
A period after handover (or practical completion) during which the owner may identify any shortcomings in relation to the building specification ('defects'), with a view to the contractor correcting the defect.

=== Maintenance, repair and improvement ===
Maintenance involves functional checks, servicing, repairing or replacing of necessary devices, equipment, machinery, building infrastructure, and supporting utilities in industrial, business, governmental, and residential installations.

=== Demolition ===
Demolition is the discipline of safely and efficiently tearing down buildings and other artificial structures. Demolition contrasts with deconstruction, which involves taking a building apart while carefully preserving valuable elements for reuse purposes (recycling – see also circular economy).

== Industry scale and characteristics ==
=== Economic activity ===
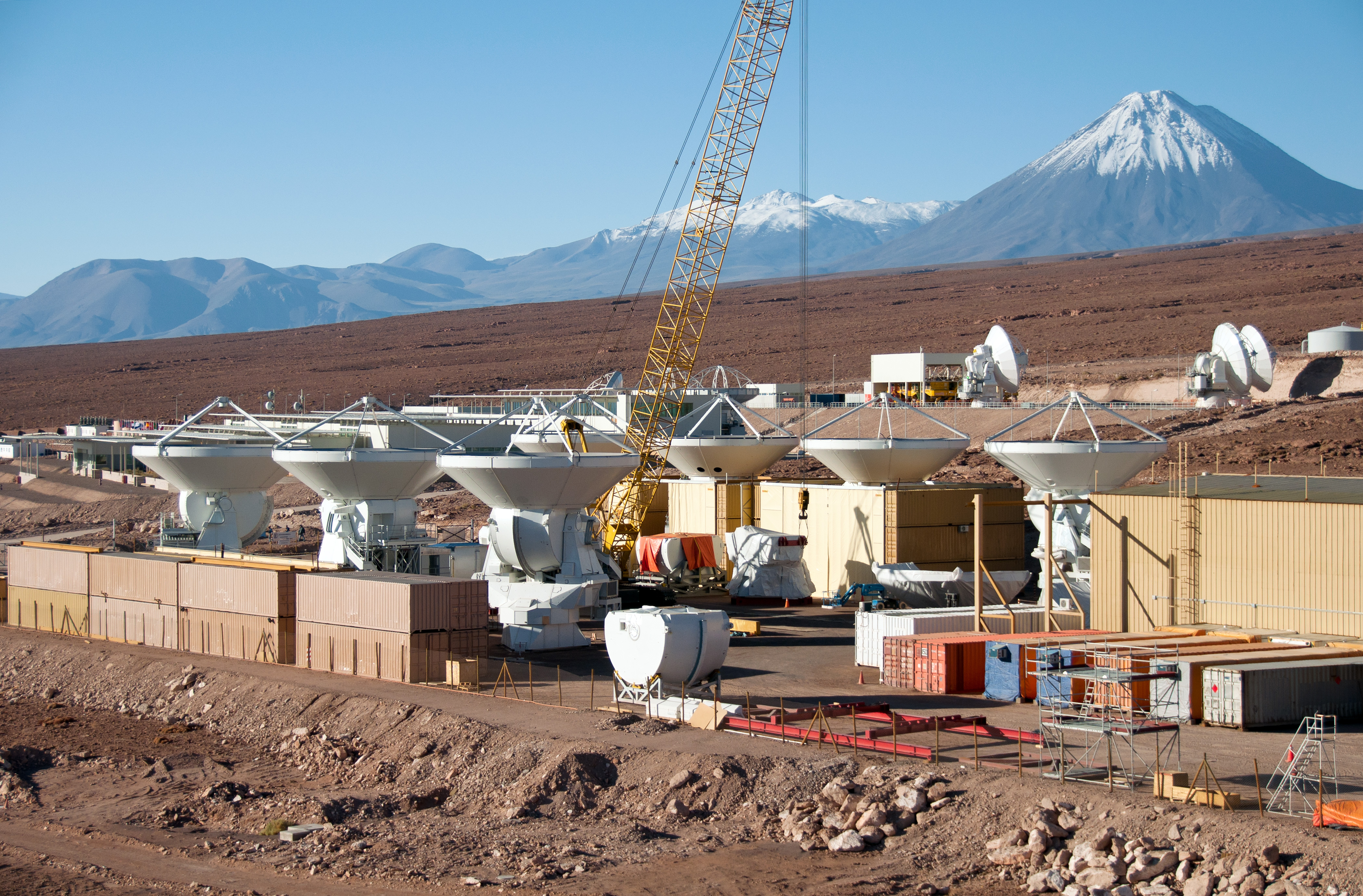
Helicopter view of the Atacama Large Millimeter/submillimeter Array (ALMA) Operations Support Facility (OSF) construction site

The output of the global construction industry was worth an estimated $10.8 trillion in 2017, and in 2018 was forecast to rise to $12.9 trillion by 2022, and to around $14.8 trillion in 2030. As a sector, construction accounts for more than 10% of global GDP (in developed countries, construction comprises 6–9% of GDP), and employs around 7% of the total employed workforce around the globe (accounting for over 273 million full- and part-time jobs in 2014). Since 2010, China has been the world's largest single construction market. The United States is the second largest construction market with a 2018 output of $1.581 trillion.

- In the United States in February 2020, around $1.4 trillion worth of construction work was in progress, according to the Census Bureau, of which just over $1.0 trillion was for the private sector (split roughly 55:45% between residential and nonresidential); the remainder was public sector, predominantly for state and local government.
- In Armenia, the construction sector experienced growth during the latter part of 2000s. Based on National Statistical Service, Armenia's construction sector generated approximately 20% of Armenia's GDP during the first and second quarters of 2007. In 2009, according to the World Bank, 30% of Armenia's economy was from construction sector.
- In Vietnam, the construction industry plays an important role in the national economy. The Vietnamese construction industry has been one of the fastest growing in the Asia-Pacific region in recent years. The market was valued at nearly $60 billion in 2021. In the first half of 2022, Vietnam's construction industry growth rate reached 5.59%. In 2022, Vietnam's construction industry accounted for more than 6% of the country's GDP, equivalent to over 589.7 billion Vietnamese dong. The industry of industry and construction accounts for 38.26% of Vietnam's GDP. At the same time, the industry is one of the most attractive industries for foreign direct investment (FDI) in recent years.

Construction is a major source of employment in most countries; high reliance on small businesses, and under-representation of women are common traits. For example:

- In the US, construction employed around 11.4m people in 2020, with a further 1.8m employed in architectural, engineering, and related professional services – equivalent to just over 8% of the total US workforce. The construction workers were employed in over 843,000 organisations, of which 838,000 were privately held businesses. In March 2016, 60.4% of construction workers were employed by businesses with fewer than 50 staff. Women are substantially underrepresented (relative to their share of total employment), comprising 10.3% of the US construction workforce, and 25.9% of professional services workers, in 2019.
- The United Kingdom construction sector contributed £117 billion (6%) to UK GDP in 2018, and in 2019 employed 2.4m workers (6.6% of all jobs). These worked either for 343,000 'registered' construction businesses, or for 'unregistered' businesses, typically self-employed contractors; just over one million small/medium-sized businesses, mainly self-employed individuals, worked in the sector in 2019, comprising about 18% of all UK businesses. Women comprised 12.5% of the UK construction workforce.

According to McKinsey research, productivity growth per worker in construction has lagged behind many other industries across different countries including in the United States and in European countries. In the United States, construction productivity per worker has declined by half since the 1960s.

=== Construction GVA by country ===
List of countries with the largest construction gross value added in 2018
Economy	Construction GVA in 2018 (billions in USD)
(01) China	934.2
(02) United States	839.1
(03) Japan	275.5
(04) India	201.2
(05) Germany	180.5
(06) United Kingdom	154.7
(07) France	138.7
(08) Canada	125.4
(09) Russia	121.2
(10) Australia	111.8
(11) Indonesia	109.7
(12) South Korea	93.0
(13) Brazil	92.6
(14) Mexico	89.0
(15) Spain	80.0
(16) Italy	78.9
(17) Turkey	55.3
(18) Saudi Arabia	40.2
(19) Netherlands	39.5
(20) Poland	39.4
(21) Switzerland	36.3
(22) United Arab Emirates	34.5
(23) Sweden	33.3
(24) Austria	27.2
(25) Qatar	27.0
The twenty-five largest countries in the world by construction GVA (2018)

=== Employment ===
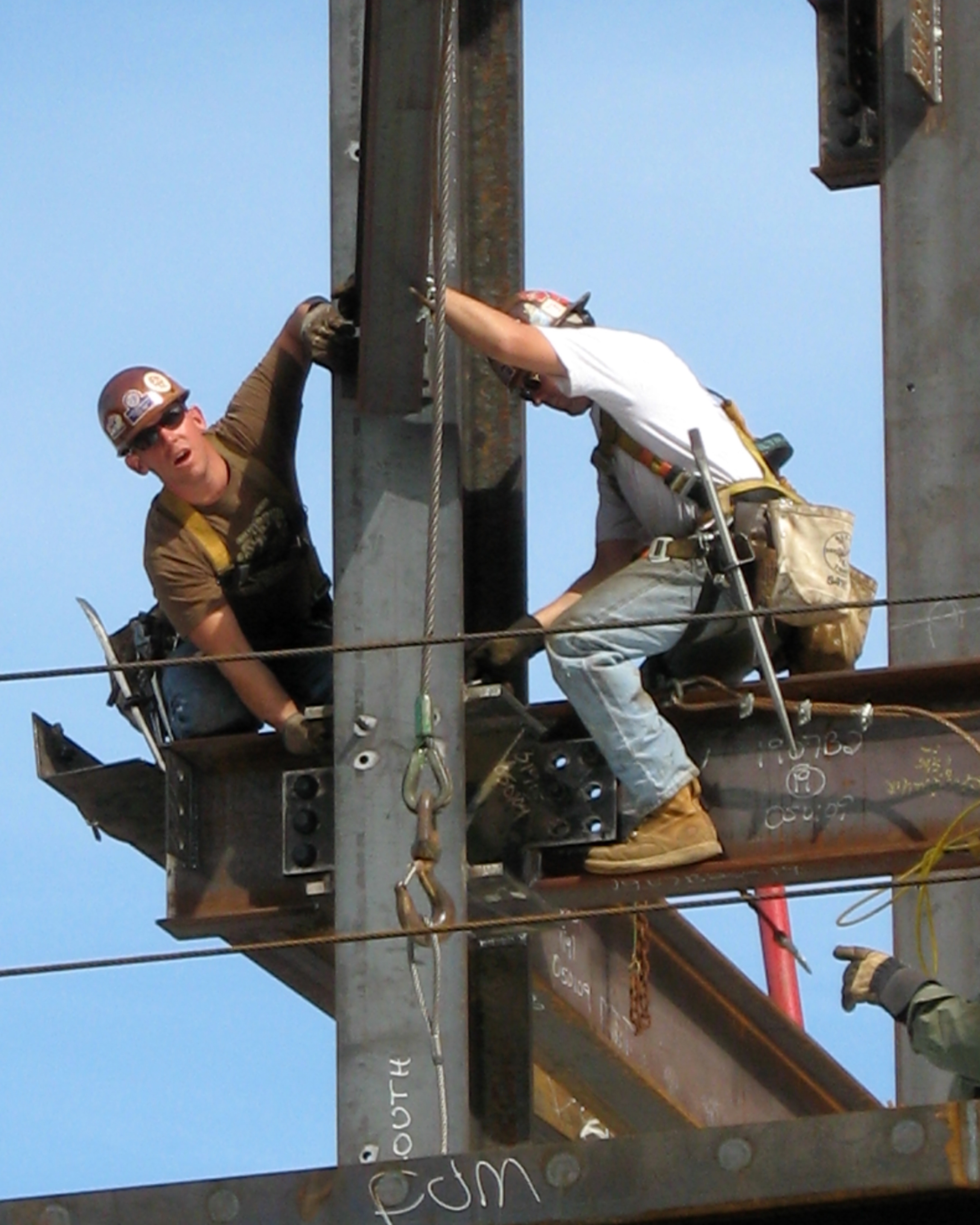
Ironworkers erecting the steel frame of a new building at Massachusetts General Hospital in Boston

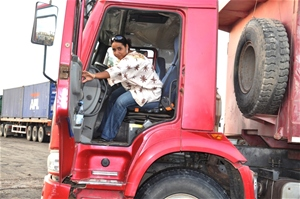
A truck operator at Al Gamil, the largest construction company in Djibouti

Some workers may be engaged in manual labour as unskilled or semi-skilled workers; they may be skilled tradespeople; or they may be supervisory or managerial personnel. Under safety legislation in the United Kingdom, for example, construction workers are defined as people "who work for or under the control of a contractor on a construction site"; in Canada, this can include people whose work includes ensuring conformance with building codes and regulations, and those who supervise other workers.

Laborers comprise a large grouping in most national construction industries. In the United States, for example, in May 2023, the construction sector employed just over 7.9 million people, of whom 859,000 were laborers, while 3.7 million were construction trades workers (including 603,000 carpenters, 559,000 electricians, 385,000 plumbers, and 321,000 equipment operators). Like most business sectors, there is also substantial white-collar employment in construction - out of 7.9 million US construction sector workers, 681,000 were recorded by the United States Department of Labor in May 2023 as in 'office and administrative support occupations', 620,000 in 'management occupations' and 480,000 in 'business and financial operations occupations'.

Large-scale construction requires collaboration across multiple disciplines. A project manager normally manages the budget on the job, and a construction manager, design engineer, construction engineer or architect supervises it. Those involved with the design and execution must consider zoning requirements and legal issues, environmental impact of the project, scheduling, budgeting and bidding, construction site safety, availability and transportation of building materials, logistics, and inconvenience to the public, including those caused by construction delays.

Some models and policy-making organisations promote the engagement of local labour in construction projects as a means of tackling social exclusion and addressing skill shortages. In the UK, the Joseph Rowntree Foundation reported in 2000 on 25 projects which had aimed to offer training and employment opportunities for locally based school leavers and unemployed people. The Foundation published "a good practice resource book" in this regard at the same time. Use of local labour and local materials were specified for the construction of the Danish Storebaelt bridge, but there were legal issues which were challenged in court and addressed by the European Court of Justice in 1993. The court held that a contract condition requiring use of local labour and local materials was incompatible with EU treaty principles. Later UK guidance noted that social and employment clauses, where used, must be compatible with relevant EU regulation. Employment of local labour was identified as one of several social issues which could potentially be incorporated in a sustainable procurement approach, although the interdepartmental Sustainable Procurement Group recognised that "there is far less scope to incorporate [such] social issues in public procurement than is the case with environmental issues".

There are many routes to the different careers within the construction industry. There are three main tiers of construction workers based on educational background and training, which vary by country:

==== Unskilled and semi-skilled workers ====
Unskilled and semi-skilled workers provide general site labor, often have few or no construction qualifications, and may receive basic site training.

==== Skilled tradespeople ====
Skilled tradespeople have typically served apprenticeships (sometimes in labor unions) or received technical training; this group also includes on-site managers who possess extensive knowledge and experience in their craft or profession. Skilled manual occupations include carpenters, electricians, plumbers, ironworkers, heavy equipment operators and masons, as well as those involved in project management. In the UK these require further education qualifications, often in vocational subject areas, undertaken either directly after completing compulsory education or through "on the job" apprenticeships.

==== Professional, technical or managerial personnel ====
Professional, technical and managerial personnel often have higher education qualifications, usually graduate degrees, and are trained to design and manage construction processes. These roles require more training as they demand greater technical knowledge, and involve more legal responsibility. Example roles (and qualification routes) include:

- Architect – Will usually have studied architecture to degree level, and then undertaken further study and gained professional experience. In many countries, the title of "architect" is protected by law, strictly limiting its use to qualified people.
- Civil engineer – Typically holds a degree in a related subject and may only be eligible for membership of a professional institution (such as the UK's ICE) following completion of additional training and experience. In some jurisdictions, a new university graduate must hold a master's degree to become chartered, (Note: In the UK, the Chartered Engineer qualification is controlled by the Engineering Council, and is often achieved through membership of the relevant professional institution (ICE, CIBSE, IStructE, etc).) and persons with bachelor's degrees may become Incorporated Engineers.
- Building services engineer – May also be referred to as an "M&E" or "mechanical, electrical, and plumbing (MEP) engineer" and typically holds a degree in mechanical or electrical engineering.
- Project manager – Typically holds a 4-year or greater higher education qualification, but are often also qualified in another field such as architecture, civil engineering or quantity surveying.
- Structural engineer – Typically holds a bachelor's or master's degree in structural engineering.
- Quantity surveyor – Typically holds a bachelor's degree in quantity surveying. UK chartered status is gained from the Royal Institution of Chartered Surveyors.

== Safety ==
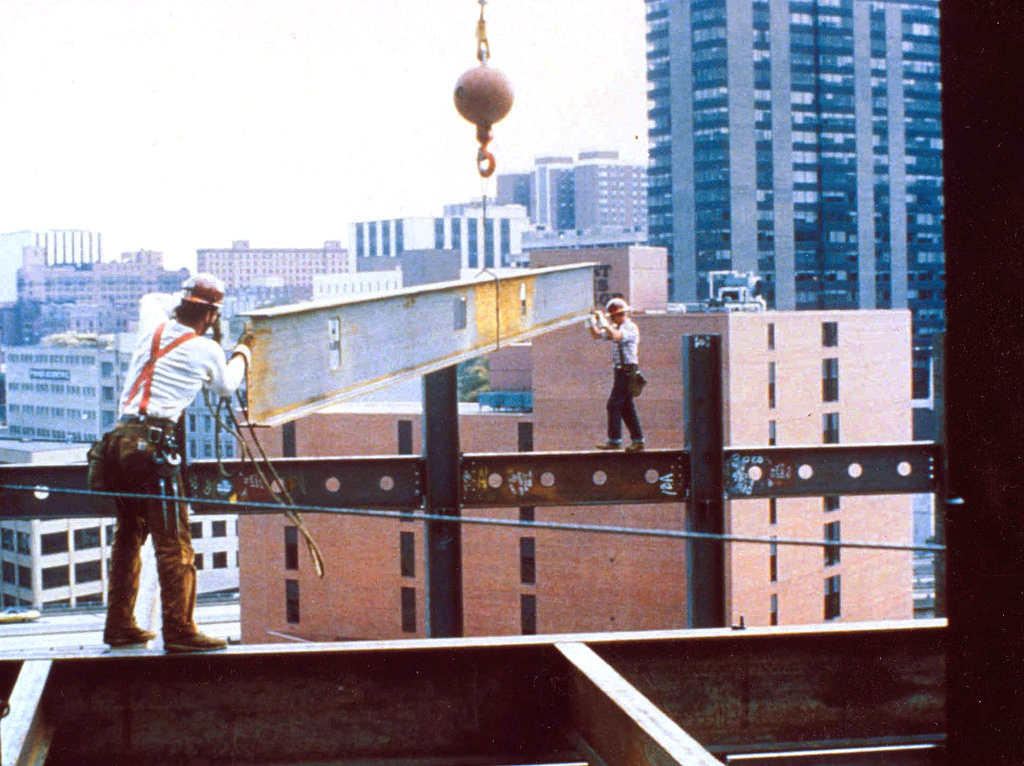
At-risk workers without appropriate safety equipment

Construction is one of the most dangerous occupations in the world, incurring more occupational fatalities than any other sector in both the United States and in the European Union. In the US in 2019, 1,061, or about 20%, of worker fatalities in private industry occurred in construction. In 2017, more than a third of US construction fatalities (366 out of 971 total fatalities) were the result of falls; in the UK, half of the average 36 fatalities per annum over a five-year period to 2021 were attributed to falls from height. Proper safety equipment such as harnesses, hard hats and guardrails and procedures such as securing ladders and inspecting scaffolding can curtail the risk of occupational injuries in the construction industry. Other major causes of fatalities in the construction industry include electrocution, transportation accidents, and trench cave-ins.

Other safety risks for workers in construction include hearing loss due to high noise exposure, musculoskeletal injury, chemical exposure, and high levels of stress. Besides that, the high turnover of workers in construction industry imposes a huge challenge of accomplishing the restructuring of work practices in individual workplaces or with individual workers. Construction has been identified by the National Institute for Occupational Safety and Health (NIOSH) as a priority industry sector in the National Occupational Research Agenda (NORA) to identify and provide intervention strategies regarding occupational health and safety issues. A study conducted in 2022 found "significant effect of air pollution exposure on construction-related injuries and fatalities", especially with the exposure of nitrogen dioxide.

=== Sustainability ===
Sustainability is an aspect of "green building", defined by the United States Environmental Protection Agency (EPA) as "the practice of creating structures and using processes that are environmentally responsible and resource-efficient throughout a building's life-cycle from siting to design, construction, operation, maintenance, renovation and deconstruction."

=== Decarbonising construction ===
The construction industry may require transformation at pace and at scale if it is to successfully contribute to achieving the target set out in The Paris Agreement of limiting global temperature rise to 1.5C above industrial levels. The World Green Building Council has stated the buildings and infrastructure around the world can reach 40% less embodied carbon emissions but that this can only be achieved through urgent transformation.

Conclusions from industry leaders have suggested that the net zero transformation is likely to be challenging for the construction industry, but it does present an opportunity. Action is demanded from governments, standards bodies, the construction sector, and the engineering profession to meet the decarbonising targets.

In 2021, the National Engineering Policy Centre published its report Decarbonising Construction: Building a new net zero industry, which outlined key areas to decarbonise the construction sector and the wider built environment. This report set out around 20 different recommendations to transform and decarbonise the construction sector, including recommendations for engineers, the construction industry and decision makers, plus outlined six-overarching 'system levers' where action taken now will result in rapid decarbonisation of the construction sector. These levels are:

- Setting and stipulating progressive targets for carbon reduction
- Embedding quantitative whole-life carbon assessment into public procurement
- Increasing design efficiency, materials reuse and retrofit of buildings
- Improving whole-life carbon performance
- Improving skills for net zero
- Adopting a joined up, systems approach to decarbonisation across the construction sector and with other sectors

Progress is being made internationally to decarbonise the sector including improvements to sustainable procurement practice such as the CO_{2} performance ladder in the Netherlands and the Danish Partnership for Green Public Procurement. There are also now demonstrations of applying the principles of circular economy practices in practice such as Circl, ABN AMRO's sustainable pavilion and the Brighton Waste House.

== Construction magazines ==
- Engineering News-Record
- Building
- Construction News
- New Civil Engineer
- Concrete and Constructional Engineering
- Consulting-Specifying Engineer
- Construct Ireland
- Building Giants
- List of woodshop magazines

== See also ==
- Agile construction – Management system in the construction industry
- Building material – Material which is used for construction purposes
- Commissioning (construction) – Process to ensure that all building systems perform according to the "Design Intent"
- Construction robots – Automation in construction
- Construction worker – Person employed in the construction industry
- Environmental impact of concrete
- Impervious surface – Artificial structures such as pavements covered with water-tight materials
- Index of construction articles
- Land degradation – Gradual destruction of land
- List of tallest structures
- List of tallest structures built before the 20th century
- List of tools and equipment
- Outline of construction – Overview of and topical guide to construction
- Rate analysis
- Real estate development – Process that creates or renovates new or existing spaces
- Structural robustness – Ability of a structure to withstand physical strain
- Umarell – Construction site watcher
