= Construction Equipment =

Business magazine

- Type: business magazine
- Format: Paper and online magazine
- Owner(s): SGC Horizon, LLC.
- Editor: Rod Sutton, Frank Raczon, Walt Moore
- Founded: 1949
- Language: English
- Headquarters: Arlington Heights, IL
- ISSN: 0192-3978
- Website: Construction Equipment

Construction Equipment is a trade publication and web site serving the information needs of construction contractors, materials producers, and other owners and operators of construction equipment. It is headquartered in Arlington Heights, Illinois.

Established in 1949, Construction Equipment is published monthly. Each issue typically includes product evaluations and buying file as new products are introduced into the market. In addition, the magazine covers fleet-management topics, including the monthly column equipment executive.

Every December, Construction Equipment ranks new products introduced that year in a feature called Top 100 new products.

As of June 2013, total BPA circulation was 76,030 subscribers.

In 2010, former owner Reed Business Information sold the magazine to MB Media. MB Media was acquired by Scranton Gillette Communications forming a sister company called SGC Horizon, LLC.

== See also ==
- List of civil engineering journals
- List of architecture journals
- Heavy equipment types

=== Construction magazines ===
- Engineering News-Record
- Building (magazine)
- Construction News
- New Civil Engineer
- Concrete and Constructional Engineering
- Consulting-Specifying Engineer
- Construct Ireland
- Building Giants
- List of woodshop magazines
