= Building Giants =

Building Giants may refer to:

- Building Giants (TV series), a British-American documentary television series
- Building Giants (magazine), a magazine published in India
