= Face Up =

Face Up may refer to:

- Face Up (magazine), an Irish Catholic magazine for teenagers
- Face Up (album), an album by Lisa Stansfield
- "Face Up", a song by Lights from The Listening
- "Face Up", a song by New Order from Low-Life
- "Face Up", a song by Rush from Roll The Bones
- Supine position, a position of the body: lying down with the face up
