= Heavy equipment operator =

Workers using engineering equipment

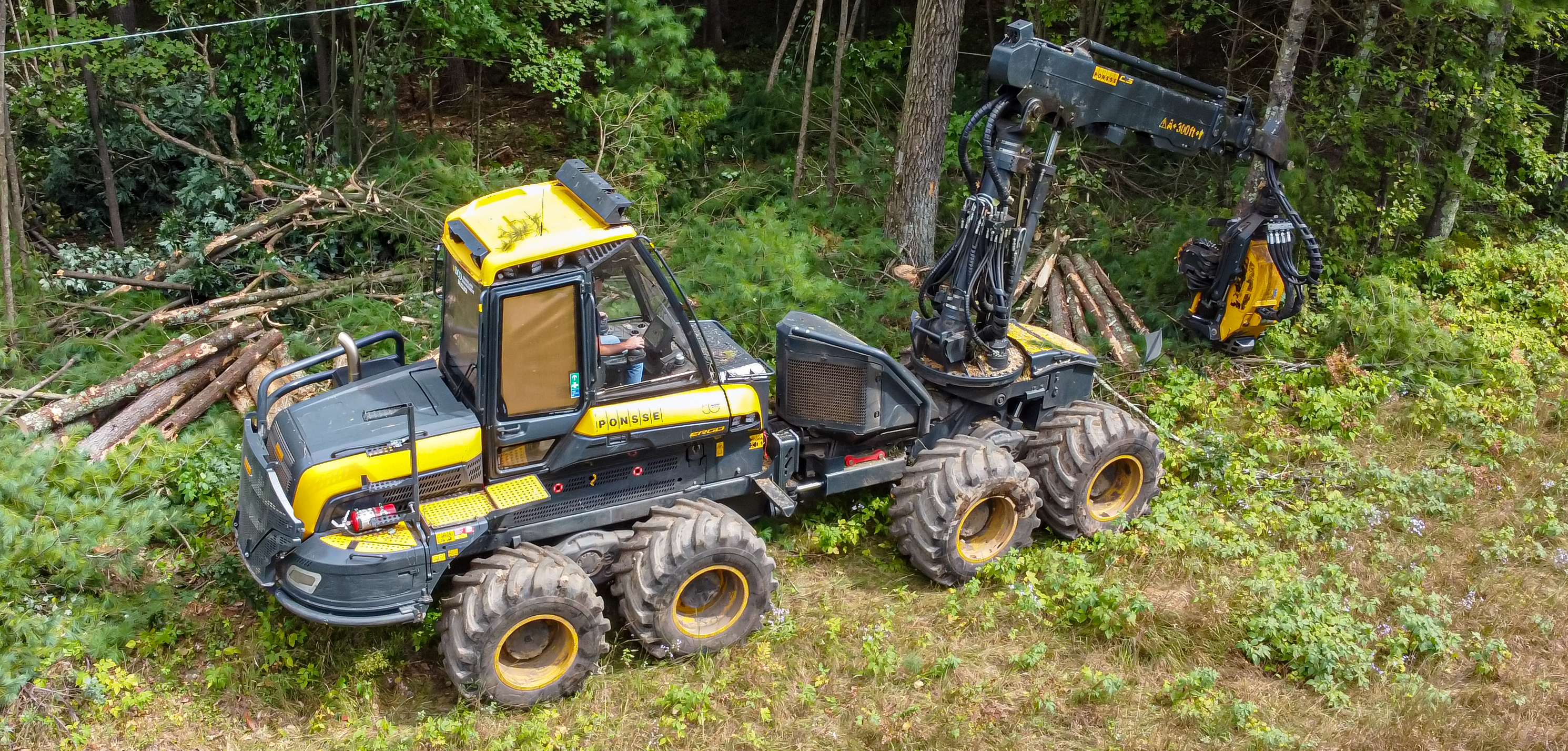
- Harvester operator

Occupation
- Occupation type: Vocation
- Activity sectors: Construction

Description
- Fields of employment: construction
- Related jobs: excavator operator, Driver

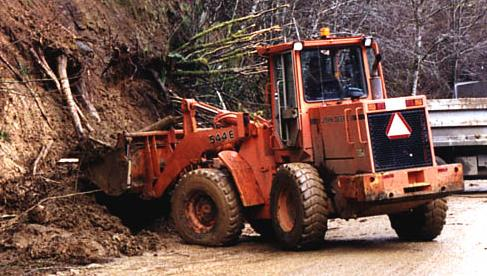
A wheeled front loader at work. This wheeled tractor is equipped with a large bucket, which can be raised or lowered by hydraulic arms.

A heavy equipment operator operates heavy equipment used in engineering and construction projects. Typically only skilled workers may operate heavy equipment, and there is specialized training for learning to use heavy equipment.

== Operator training ==
Various organizations set standards for training for heavy equipment operators. Such organizations typically offer what in the US is called "effective safety training". Specific organizations include the following:

- United States
  - International Union of Operating Engineers
  - Association of Equipment Manufacturers
  - National Association of Heavy Equipment Training Schools
- Canada
  - International Union of Operating Engineers

== Safety ==
Much publication about heavy equipment operators focuses on improving safety for such workers. The occupational medicine field researches and makes recommendations about safety for these and other workers in safety-sensitive positions. Hand signals are also important for machinery operators as it facilitates visual aid for safe work in spite of factors such as noise and a crowded environment.

== Notable heavy equipment operators ==
- Mack Ray Edwards (1918–1971), child sex abuser/serial killer; buried victims at his construction sites; committed suicide by hanging in his prison cell

== Types ==
These subdivisions, in this order, are the standard heavy equipment categorization.

Tractor

- Bulldozer (dozer, track dozer)
- Combine harvester
- Snowcat
- Snowplow
- Skidder
- Tractor (wheel tractor)
- Tracked tractor
- Locomotive
- Artillery tractor
- Crawler-transporter
- Military engineering vehicles

Grader

- Grader

Excavator

- Amphibious excavator
- Compact excavator
- Dragline excavator
- Dredger
- Bucket-wheel excavator
- Excavator (digger)
- Long reach excavator
- Power shovel
- Reclaimer
- Suction excavator
- Walking excavator
- Trencher
- Yarder

Backhoe

- Backhoe
- Backhoe loader

Timber

- Feller buncher
- Harvester
- Forwarder
- Skidder
- Power saw
- Stump grinder
- Track harvester
- Wheel forwarder
- Wheel skidder
- Logging truck

Pipelayer

- Pipelayer (sideboom)

Scraper

- Fresno scraper
- Scraper
- Wheel tractor-scraper (belly scraper)

Mining

- Construction and mining tractor
- Construction and mining truck
- Dumper
- Dump truck
- Haul truck
- Mining equipment
- Raise borer

Articulated

- Articulated hauler

Compactor

- Wheel dozer (soil compactor)
- Soil stabilizer

Loader

- Loader (payloader, front loader, wheel loader, integrated tool carrier)
- Skip loader (skippy)

Track loader

- Track loader

Skid-steer loader

- Skid-steer loader

Material handler

- Aerial work platform, Lift table
- Crane
- Block-setting crane
- Bulk-handling crane
- Crane vessel
- Aerial crane
- Container crane
- Gantry crane
- Overhead crane
- Electric overhead traveling crane
- Ring crane
- Level luffing crane
- Mobile crane
- Travel lift
- Forklift
- Garbage truck
- Grapple truck, Knuckleboom loader (trailer mount)
- Straddle carrier
- Sidelifter
- Reach stacker
- Telescopic handlers
- Tow truck

Paving

- Asphalt paver
- Asphalt plant
- Cold planer
- Cure rig
- Paver
- Pavement milling
- Pneumatic tire compactor
- Roller (road roller, roller compactor)
- Slipform paver
- Vibratory compactor, Compactor

Underground

- Roadheader
- Tunnel boring machine
- Underground mining equipment

Hydromatic tool

- Ballast tamper
- Attachments
- Drilling rig
- Horizontal directional drilling
- Earth auger
- Pile driver
- Post pounder
- Rotary tiller (rototiller, rotovator)

Hydraulic machinery

Highway

- Tractor unit
- Ballast tractor
- Pushback tractor
- Railcar mover
- Highway 10 yard rear dump
- Highway bottom dump (stiff), pup (belly train), triple
- Highway end dump and side dump
- Highway transfer, Transfer train
- Concrete mixer
- Concrete mix truck
- Concrete mix dozer
- Lowboy (trailer)
- Street sweeper
- Street sweep truck
- Street sweep dozer

== See also ==
- Apprenticeship
- Benjamin Holt
- Construction Equipment (magazine)
- Construction worker
- Hydraulic machinery
- International Union of Operating Engineers
- List of civil engineering journals
- List of construction occupations
- List of construction trades
- Lists of occupations
