= Mongrel (disambiguation) =

A mongrel is a dog that does not belong to one officially recognized breed and is not the result of intentional breeding.

Mongrel may also refer to:

== Music ==
- Mongrel (band), a British-Irish band formed in 2008
- Mongrel (The Number Twelve Looks Like You album), 2007
- Mongrel (The Bob Seger System album), 1970

== Stage and screen ==
- Mongrel (1982 film), a 1982 American film
- The Mongrel, a 2012 Italian film
- Mongrel (2024 film), a 2024 Taiwanese-Singaporean-French film
- Mongrels (2024 film), a Canadian film directed by Jerome Yoo
- Mongrels (TV series), a British puppet-based situation comedy series

== Other uses ==
- Mongrel (magazine), an Irish magazine 2003–2008
- Mongrel (web server), an open-source software library
- Mongrel Media, a Canadian film distributor
- Mongrel Mob, a New Zealand gang
- Mongrel complex, a national inferiority complex in Brazil
- Mongrels, a 2016 novel by Stephen Graham Jones
- Mongrel, a derogatory term for mixed-race people

== See also ==
- Hybrid (biology)
- Mixed breed
- Variety (botany)
- Mongraal
