= Business Plus =

Business Plus can refer to:

- Business Plus (magazine), an Irish business magazine published in Dublin
- Business Plus (publisher), an imprint of Grand Central Publishing
- Business Plus (TV Channel), a 24-hour Pakistani business channel
