= Saint Martin Magazine =

- The first edition from November 1952 was known as Blessed Martin Magazine.
- Editor: Diarmuid Clifford
- Categories: Classics, Etymology, Gardening, Health, History, News, Religion
- Frequency: Monthly
- Format: Booklet
- Total circulation: Millions
- First issue: 72 years, 4 months ago
- Company: Saint Martin Apostolate
- Country: Ireland
- Based in: Dublin
- Language: English
- Website: stmartin.ie
- ISSN: 1393-1008

Saint Martin Magazine is a monthly publication of Dublin's Saint Martin Apostolate. Its title is in memoriam Martin de Porres, while its intention is "to instruct and encourage" while partaking of the act of self-support financially. It is often cited alongside such august (and older) publications as The Universe, The Catholic Times, The Catholic Herald and The Irish Catholic.

Saint Martin Magazine is edited by Diarmuid Clifford. Design in recent years has been credited to Patricia Hope.

First appearing in print as Blessed Martin Magazine in November 1952 (Martin was canonized in 1962 by Pope John XXIII), it came at a cost of fourpence. From 1962 until 1991 it was known as Saint Martin de Porres Magazine and its International Standard Serial Number under this title was 1393-1032. It adopted the title Saint Martin Magazine from 1991 onwards.

Saint Martin Magazine comes as a small booklet and can be purchased in Irish post offices and churches, as well as by subscription. It is often referenced in other print publications in Ireland. In mid-2017 it became available online for the first time.

Saint Martin Magazine features articles on such areas as diverse as world events, health (under the title Medico) and gardening, a Lectio Divina, stories, photographs, a section featuring answers to questions submitted by the readership or encountered during other work, and a section called Echoes (which treats of some historical or etymological event - sometimes related to the time of year) as well as a monthly editorial and opinion pieces. Its articles are sometimes published by other sources. It also carries vocations advertisements.

Copies of Saint Martin Magazine from decades past are held at Trinity College Library, including from its time as Saint Martin de Porres Magazine. It is also held by the British Library.
