= Film Ireland =

Irish film magazine

Film Ireland is a cultural cinema magazine published from 1987 to 2013 by Filmbase (a.k.a. Film Base) Centre for Film and Video in Dublin, Ireland. It is Ireland's longest-running film publication. Film Ireland magazine ceased publication in 2013, but maintains an online presence.

== History ==
The cover of Filmbase News (later renamed Film Ireland) issue one (May/June 1987)

Film Ireland began publication in 1987 under the title Filmbase News. The magazine was initially a photocopied newsletter distributed to members of the organisation. The first issue contained news about current short and feature film productions, information on funding schemes, and film festival reports. According to the magazine's first editor, Johnny Gogan (who shared the credit "compiled by" with Mike Collins and John Gormley in early issues): "The 1987 Film Base AGM had called for a better distribution of information to the growing membership. Ireland was a word-of-mouth culture where information was guarded and opinions often verbalised on bar-stools but less often committed to print. The film scene was no exception. Vinny McCabe and Mike Collins had taken up the cause of a newsletter after the AGM and I was dragged in to assist their information sub-committee, joined by John Gormley (now TD)".

In 1992, after thirty issues, Filmbase News changed its name to Film Ireland. Editor Patrick Barrett explained that the change of name was intended to reflect the magazine's widening audience, but former editor Johnny Gogan later stated that "the name change [was] presented as a fait accompli to the board and the organisation". Gogan opposed the move to make the publication into a national magazine "out of a belief in the parochial which has endured", while later editor Hugh Linehan considered it "a progressive and ambitious move, but one which threw up its own challenges".

Other editors of the magazine included Paul Power, who maintained the magazine's status as a journal of record by keeping "local writers, directors, and producers in the frame of almost every story"; Hugh Linehan, who went on to edit The Ticket, the weekly entertainment supplement of The Irish Times; Ted Sheehy, Ireland correspondent of Screen International, "who was often critical of the lack of a professional film grammar within much Irish film production"; and Tony Keily, who believed that film criticism and publication "should be radicated in a common film culture. And the job of a publication like Film Ireland is to provide a small space for that culture to grow. A pluralist space that doesn't obviously belong to anybody". The Film Ireland website, FilmIreland.net, was established in 2002.

== Cessation of print publication ==
In early 2013, after over 25 years in publication, Filmbase decided to cease publication of the magazine. Reductions in funding to Filmbase made the continued publication of the magazine unsustainable and, despite the commitment and dedication of staff, contributors and the Irish filmmaking community, the cost of print publication was deemed unfeasible. The decision was made to make Film Ireland an online-only resource. In March 2018 Filmbase's funding body, the Arts Council of Ireland, appointed independent auditors to investigate the company's "financial difficulties"; Filmbase went into liquidation the following day and all of its staff were laid off.

== Ethos ==
John Carney's Once on the cover of Film Ireland 115 (March/April 2007)

Film academics Roddy Flynn and Pat Brereton described Film Ireland as "a full-fledged debating space devoted to the politics of film support and film culture in Ireland", and the magazine regularly acted as a platform for filmmakers to air their views. Filmmaker Martin Duffy questioned the Irish Film Board's development of his feature film Jenny's Gift, while writer/director Liz Gill engaged in debate with Irish Film Board CEO Mark Woods regarding the Board's low and micro-budget initiatives.

While marking the magazine's twentieth anniversary in May 2007, editor Lir Mac Cárthaigh set out the magazine's core objectives, drafted by the previous editor, Tony Keily. These objectives were "To provide a detailed public record of audiovisual culture in Ireland" and "To foster Film Culture in Ireland". To these core objectives Mac Cárthaigh added three further aims: "To raise the profile of cultural cinema exhibition across the island of Ireland", "To promote awareness of and appreciation for Ireland's cinematic heritage" and "To recognise the short film as a cultural artefact, and to encourage discussion of the form".

Film Ireland was also noted for its support of lower-budget and unconventionally funded filmmaking. Low-budget Irish productions such as Karl Golden's The Honeymooners and Perry Ogden's Pavee Lackeen were championed by the magazine, and Film Ireland was one of the first publications to write at length about John Carney's ultra-low-budget feature Once.

== Editors ==
Editors of Film Ireland:

- Johnny Gogan (Film Base News 1–17, May 1987 – June 1990)
- John Doyle (Film Base News 18–28, June 1990 – April 1992)
- Patrick Barrett (Film Base News 29–30, Film Ireland 31–34, May 1992 – May 1993)
- Frances Power (Film Ireland 35–36, June – September 1993)
- Hugh Linehan (Film Ireland 37–45, October 1993 – March 1995)
- Paul Power (Film Ireland 46–54, April 1995 – September 1996)
- Ted Sheehy (Film Ireland 55–80, October 1996 – May 2001)
- Tony Keily (Film Ireland 81–95, June 2001 – December 2003)
- Lir Mac Cárthaigh (Film Ireland 96–118, January 2004 – October 2007)
- Nerea Aymerich (Film Ireland 119–132, December 2007 – March 2010)
- Niamh Creely (Film Ireland 133–144, April 2010 – March 2013)
- Steven Galvin (www.filmireland.net April 2013 – present)

== Irish Film Poll (2002) ==
To mark Film Ireland's 100th issue in 2002, the magazine conducted a poll among its readers to determine their favourite Irish feature films. The definition of "Irish" was left open, though the films had to have been released before summer 2002, and be more than 60 minutes in duration. The results were as follows:

1. The Butcher Boy (Neil Jordan, 1997)
2. Intermission (John Crowley, 2003)
3. My Left Foot (Jim Sheridan, 1989)
4. In the Name of the Father (Jim Sheridan, 1993) and I Went Down (Paddy Breathnach, 1997)
5. The Commitments (Alan Parker, 1991)
6. The Crying Game (Neil Jordan, 1992) and Michael Collins (Neil Jordan, 1996)
7. The Field (Jim Sheridan, 1990)
8. Disco Pigs (Kirsten Sheridan, 2000) and In America (Jim Sheridan, 2003)
9. The General (John Boorman, 1998)
10. Bloody Sunday (Paul Greengrass, 2001)

== See also ==
- List of magazines in Ireland
