= The Lepracaun Cartoon Monthly =

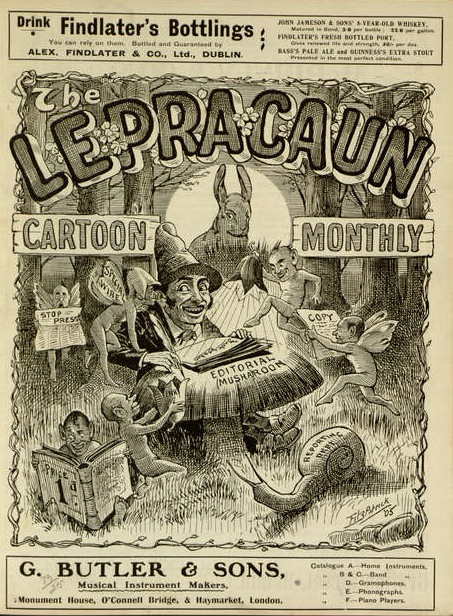
Volume 1, Number 1, May 1905

The Lepracaun Cartoon Monthly was a magazine of satirical and humorous material founded by Irish cartoonist Thomas Fitzpatrick in 1905. It included some of Fitzpatrick's finest and most entertaining work, mainly about Irish politics. Some contributors of note were James Joyce, John Fergus O'Hea and Mary Fitzpatrick O'Brien, Fitzpatrick's daughter who took over the magazine after his death in 1912. There are varying reports of when the Lepracaun Cartoon Monthly ceased publication, one source reporting 1919 and another reporting less than ten years after publication began in 1905.
