= Thomas Fitzpatrick (cartoonist) =

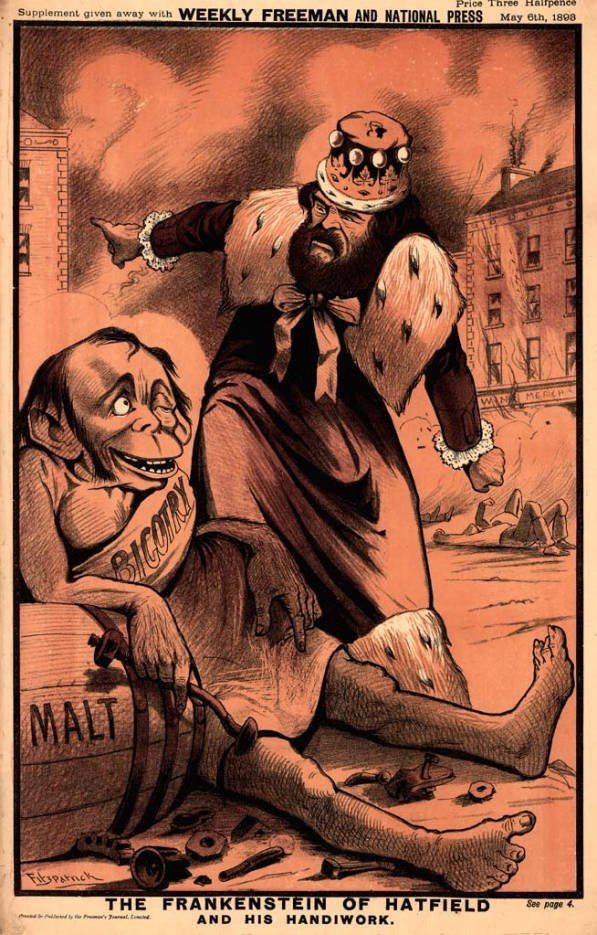
"The Frankenstein of Hatfield", cartoon of Lord Salisbury, 1893

Thomas Fitzpatrick (27 March 1860 – 16 July 1912), pen name Fitz, was an Irish political cartoonist, illustrator and magazine publisher.

== Life ==
Fitzpatrick was born in Cork on 27 March 1860. As a boy, Fitzpatrick was known for drawing caricatures of his classmates. He was an apprentice with Cork colour printing and publishing firm Messrs. Guy at 26 Academy Street. Once he was finished his seven-year training, he moved to Dublin and began working as a lithographer, and lived at 6 Upper Sackville Street. Fitzpatrick lived for a few years in London, but lived in Dublin for the majority of his life. He worked as a lithographer with City Printing Co. and Messrs Woods of High Street.

He contributed to the satirical magazine Pat (published from 1881 to 1883), the Weekly Freeman, the Irish Figaro, the Irish Emerald, the Weekly Nation, Punch and the New York Gaelic American, and was for a time chief cartoonist of the National Press. Through this work, he established himself as a political cartoonist similar to John Fergus O'Hea. At this time, he also undertook book and magazine illustration, as well as photo engraving and process work.

In 1905 he launched his own satirical magazine, The Lepracaun, which he edited and drew most of the cartoons and illustrations for until his health began to fail in 1911. Walter Strickland states that this work as "his best and most humorous". His daughter and fellow artist, Mary Fitzpatrick O'Brien, continued to edit and publish the magazine. His work often included references to John Bull, with "bulging eyes and paunch and heavy jowls". Fitzpatrick died at his home, 10 Cabra Road, on 16 July 1912 with the cause of death given as "neurasthenia (overwork)".

A collection of Fitzpatrick's cartoons from The Lepracaun was published in book form in 1913. He was also a master illuminator and with his daughter, Mary, he produced many illuminated and richly decorated scrolls and paintings, many reflecting the influence of the early Celtic Revival.

He is the grandfather of the Irish fantasy artist Jim Fitzpatrick.
