= Rate analysis =

Rate analysis for construction works is the process of assessing rates for unit of work or supply. It breaks down the construction activity in its basic components such as labor, overheads, taxes, contractor profit and basic rate of individual material.

== Purpose ==
The aim to is determine project costs, preparation of estimates for the necessary invitation of bids. The process can be used by governmental and non governmental agencies for accessing the project costs in advance and compare the availability of budgets requiring for completion of projects. The rate of analysis for the particular item in construction can vary over the years depending upon the inflation in basic rate of the item or the tax slabs in the particular country and other factors which form its core. It ensures project is transparent and accurately budgeted.

== Calculation ==
The factors that affect rate analysis are labor costs, material costs, tax slabs in countries, contractors profit, location of site/carriages, overhead costs like electricity charges and water charges. The material costs are verified from the local market or the maximum retail prices allowed by the government to sell the item. The labour costs for the unit item is taken as some percentage of basic material cost, wastages are added ranging from 1-5% depending upon nature of item, water charges and electricity charges are usually 1% each, all these quantities are added and suitable sales and income taxes are added to them, atlast contractors profit usually ranging from 10-20% is added and labour taxes are also incurred. The unit rate of item thus formed can be used for the preparation of bill of quantities. The necessary costing and estimation of projects can be accurately calculated by knowing the unit rates of items to be used in the project. Rate analysis thus have the impact on choices of materials to be used in the particular project by keeping in view the cost considerations of the project.
