= The Catholic Times (UK and Ireland) =

- Type: Weekly newspaper
- Format: Broadsheet, Tabloid
- Publisher: Universe Media Group
- Language: English
- City: Manchester
- Country: UK
- Sister newspapers: The Universe
- Website: universecatholicweekly.co.uk

The Catholic Times was a weekly newspaper for Roman Catholics in Great Britain and Ireland originally founded in 1860. In 1920 The Newspaper Press Directory described the Catholic Times as an independent journal whose "home and foreign news services are the best, while the ablest literary talent, at home and abroad, is secured to make the Catholic Times a good general and family paper". From 1933 to 1937 it was edited by Rev'd Dr. Bernard Grimley making it the only Catholic weekly which had a priest as its editor. During this period its estimated circulation was 37,000. The paper continued publication into the late 1960s.

In 1993 it was relaunched as a competitor to the Catholic Herald. Former BBC journalist Norman Cresswell came out of retirement to be its editor. He was succeeded by Kevin Flaherty in 1996, who remained the Catholic Times' editor for more than two decades. It was published in Manchester, United Kingdom, by the Universe Media Group as a companion paper to The Universe. With sales declining during the UK's COVID-19 lockdown it was merged with The Universe on 1 May 2020, where its columns continued in a supplement.
