= Irish Countrysports and Country Life Magazine =

Irish hunting, shooting, fishing and country lifestyle magazine

Irish Countrysports and Country Life Magazine is an Irish hunting, shooting, fishing and country lifestyle magazine. From 1985 until 2002 it was known as The Irish Hunting, Shooting and Fishing Magazine. The magazine is produced quarterly and features seasonal articles on hunting, fishing, shooting, deer stalking, gamekeeping, gundogs, art, antiques, property, interior design and conservation.

== History ==
The Irish Hunting, Shooting and Fishing Magazine, the publication's original title, was first published in April 1985 and has had a number of editors, including founding editor Albert Titterington, Thomas Wilkes and publishing editor Emma Cowan. It was renamed Irish Countrysports and Country Life by Albert Titterington in 2002. It is Ireland's longest continuously published country sports magazine. Over the years, the magazine has carried articles by such sportsmen as Capt. Jimmy Hamilton, Major William Brownlow, John Beach, Brian Plummer, Tony Jackson and Simon Everett.

The magazine has been involved in supporting or sponsoring country sports and fishing bodies in Ireland, including FISSTA, NARGC, CAI, IFA Countryside, and BASC.
