= ComputerScope =

Computer magazine

- Editor: Paul Hearns
- Categories: Computer magazines
- Frequency: Monthly
- Total circulation: 10,000
- Founded: 1984
- Final issue: 2020
- Company: MediaTeam
- Country: Ireland
- Based in: Dublin
- Language: English
- Website: ComputerScope.ie
- ISSN: 0332-0197

ComputerScope was a computer magazine edited and produced by the publishing company MediaTeam in Dublin, Ireland between 1984 and 2020.

== History ==
ComputerScope was first published in 1984 by the Scope Communications Group. It was then published by MediaTeam Ltd, which was formed when CPG and Scope Communications merged in 2005. The magazine was edited by Paul Hearns. It was renamed as TechPro magazine in 2014.

== Description ==
ComputerScope was a monthly end-user Information and Communications Technology magazine targeting IT professionals in the public and private sectors in Ireland. It was distributed as a request-only, controlled circulation publication; readers must qualify to receive a free subscription. Those who did not meet the criteria to receive free copies could obtain a paid subscription..

ComputerScope was audited by the Audit Bureau of Circulations (UK); the website claimed to have 10,000 readers. The magazine and its sister title Irish Computer were both replaced by TechCentral.ie.

== MediaTeam ==
MediaTeam also published three other ICT titles: Irish Computer, Smart Company, and PCLive!, plus Shelflife and The Irish Garden. MediaTeam is a member of the Periodical Publishers Association of Ireland.
