= National Association of Heavy Equipment Training Schools =

- Formation: 2005
- Type: professional association
- Headquarters: Henderson, Nevada
- Location: United States
- Members: 3 members
- Official language: English
- Executive Director: Mathew Klabacka

The National Association of Heavy Equipment Training Schools (NAHETS) founded 2005, is an association of heavy equipment operator training schools in the United States. Mission Statement: Through curriculum development and operational oversight, NAHETS oversees member schools in training and preparing individual careers in heavy equipment and crane operations through member support, institutional standards, and industry relations.
