= Irish Builder =

Trade journal published in Dublin, Ireland

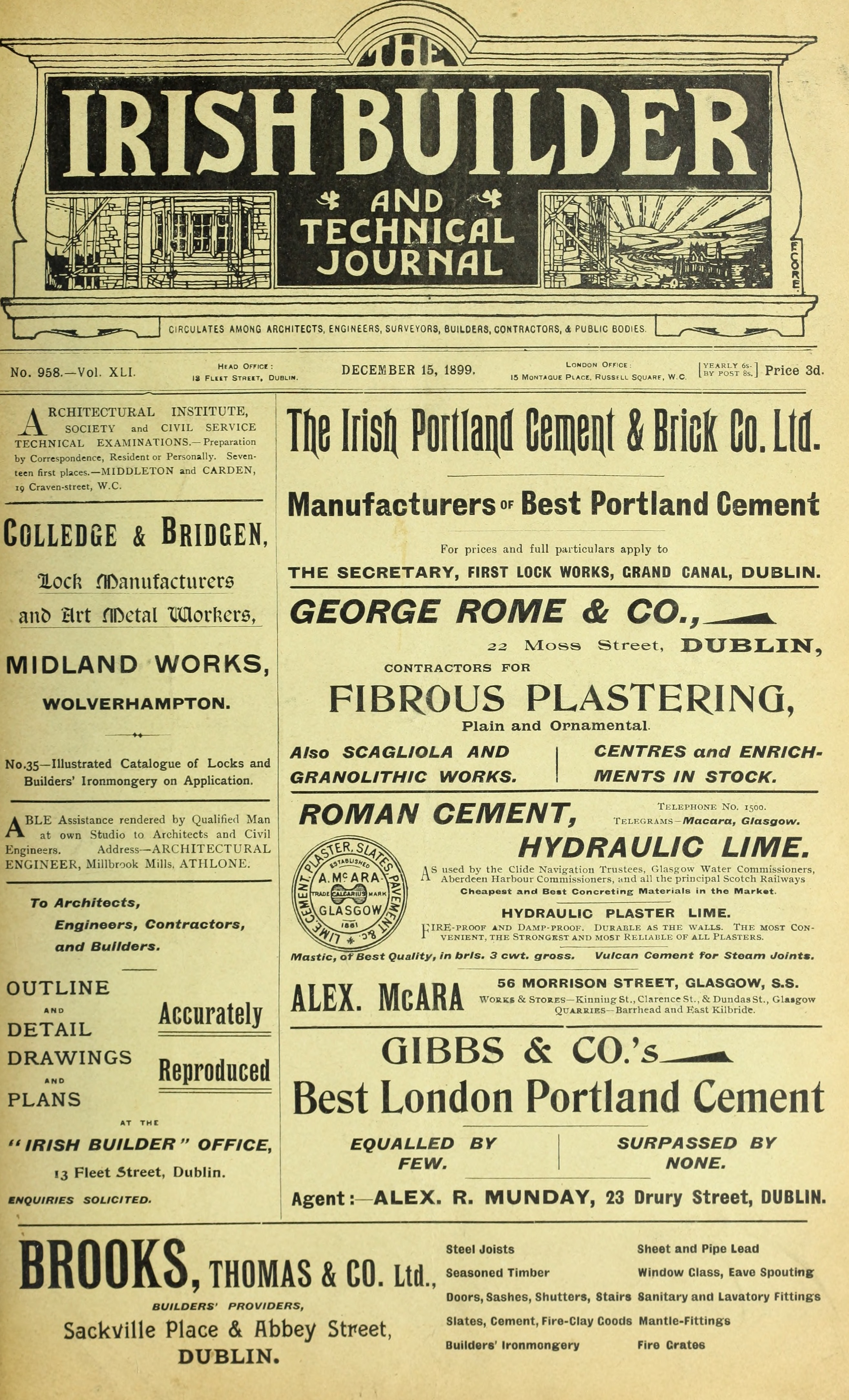
- Front cover of 15 December 1899 issue
- Former editors: J. J. Lyons
- Categories: building, architecture, civil engineering
- Frequency: Monthly, bi-monthly
- First issue: 1867
- Final issue: 1983
- Country: Ireland
- Based in: Dublin
- Language: English

The Irish Builder was a successful trade journal published in Dublin, Ireland, under various names. Names used by the journal were: The Dublin Builder, or Illustrated Irish Architectural, Engineering, Mechanics’ & Sanitary Journal (1859–1866); Irish Builder and Engineering Record (1867–1871); Irish Builder (1872–1899); and Irish Builder and Technical Journal to 1979. Its first proprietor and editor was an architect named J. J. Lyons.

== History and profile ==
The Irish Builder was started as a successor to the Dublin Builder in 1867. Historical copies of the Dublin Builder are available to search and view in digitised form at The British Newspaper Archive.

The Irish Builder appeared twice monthly and was originally priced at fourpence, reduced to threepence after 1866. Subjects dealt with included economic matters, city planning, ventilation and health issues, lists of contracts awarded, and announcements regarding new materials or interesting buildings. The magazine ceased publication in 1983.

=== List of The Dublin Builder editions available free online (1859–1866) ===
- The Dublin Builder (1859) vol. 1
- The Dublin Builder (1860) vol. 2
- The Dublin Builder (1861) vol. 3
- The Dublin Builder (1862) vol. 4
- The Dublin Builder (1863) vol. 5
- The Dublin Builder (1864) vol. 6
- The Dublin Builder (1865) vol. 7
- The Dublin Builder (1866) vol. 8

=== List of Irish Builder and Engineering Record editions available free online (1867–1871) ===
- Irish Builder and Engineer (1867) vol. 9 (no link available)
- Irish Builder and Engineer (1868) vol. 10 (no link available)
- Irish Builder and Engineer (1869) vol. 11
- Irish Builder and Engineer (1870) vol. 12
- Irish Builder and Engineer (1871) vol. 13

=== List of Irish Builder editions available free online (1872–1899) ===
- Irish Builder and Engineer (1872) vol. 14
- Irish Builder and Engineer (1873) vol. 15
- Irish Builder and Engineer (1874) vol. 16
- Irish Builder and Engineer (1875) vol. 17
- Irish Builder and Engineer (1876) vol. 18
- Irish Builder and Engineer (1877) vol. 19
- Irish Builder and Engineer (1878) vol. 20
- Irish Builder and Engineer (1879) vol. 21
- Irish Builder and Engineer (1880) vol. 22
- Irish Builder and Engineer (1881) vol. 23
- Irish Builder and Engineer (1882) vol. 24
- Irish Builder and Engineer (1883) vol. 25
- Irish Builder and Engineer (1884) vol. 26
- Irish Builder and Engineer (1885) vol. 27
- Irish Builder and Engineer (1886) vol. 28
- Irish Builder and Engineer (1887) vol. 29
- Irish Builder and Engineer (1888) vol. 30
- Irish Builder and Engineer (1889) vol. 31
- Irish Builder and Engineer (1890) vol. 32
- Irish Builder and Engineer (1891) vol. 33
- Irish Builder and Engineer (1892) vol. 34
- Irish Builder and Engineer (1893) vol. 35
- Irish Builder and Engineer (1894) vol. 36
- Irish Builder and Engineer (1895) vol. 37
- Irish Builder and Engineer (1896) vol. 38
- Irish Builder and Engineer (1897) vol. 39
- Irish Builder and Engineer (1898) vol. 40
- Irish Builder and Engineer (1899) vol. 41
- Irish Builder and Engineer (1901) vol. 43
- Irish Builder and Engineer (1906) vol. 48
- Irish Builder and Engineer (1907) vol. 49
