= The Universe (Catholic newspaper) =

Universe Catholic Weekly
- Restoring your faith in the news
- Type: Weekly newspaper
- Publisher: Clive W. Leach
- Editor: Michael J. Winterbottom
- Founded: 1860
- Ceased publication: 2024
- Relaunched: 2021
- Language: English
- Country: United Kingdom
- Website: universecatholicweekly.co.uk

The Universe was a weekly newspaper for Roman Catholics in the United Kingdom and Ireland published from 1860 to 2024.

== History ==
=== Founding and early years ===
The paper was founded in 1860.

=== Belloc–Wells controversy ===
In the early 1920, the Catholic historian Hilaire Belloc published in "The Universe" a long series of articles sharply criticizing H. G. Wells' historical textbook, The Outline of History. In Belloc's view, Wells' book included "a number of biased statements, intolerant statements and false assumptions" about Christianity in general and the Catholic Church in particular.

Wells responded to Belloc's articles with a series of six of his own, and offered "The Universe" (and other Catholic magazines) the use of them – which was declined – for no payment. Wells responded to the refusal in a letter to The Universe:

I am sorry to receive your letter of 19 May. May I point out to you that Mr. Belloc has been attacking my reputation as a thinker, writer, an impartial historian and an educated person for four and twenty fortnights in the Universe? He has misquoted; he has misstated. Will your Catholic public tolerate no reply?

A month later, the editor of The Universe offered Wells the opportunity of correcting definite points of fact upon which he might have been misrepresented. The editor added the stipulation that Wells would not be allowed to defend his views or examine Belloc's logic. Rather than accept these restrictions, Wells edited his articles and assembled them into a single volume, his Mr. Belloc Objects to "The Outline of History".

=== Second half of the twentieth century ===
Later, as literary editor of the Catholic weekly newspaper for over 15 years, the ex-Catholic priest "by the name of Piers Compton" (1901–1986) published in 1981 the first edition of the unusual book entitled The Broken Cross: Hidden Hand In The Vatican, which was withdrawn within weeks of its initial release, catalogued as a reference book and finally reprinted in 1983 shortly before his retirement.

On 7 October 1990, The Universe relocated to Manchester, where leading Yorkshire journalist Ann Knowles took over as editor. Knowles had previously worked on regional titles in the North including the North West Evening Mail, the Nelson Leader and the Burnley Express.

=== The Kelly Era ===
In August 1995, Joseph Anthony Kelly – who had previously edited a number of well-known regional and national newspapers - became the Universe's editor. He served as editor for 27 years until the paper's closure in June 2021, the longest serving editor in the paper's 160-year history.

In 2008, Kelly was one of a five person team who completed a management buy-out of the company, after which he became Managing Editor and then group CEO of the Universe Media Group Ltd and its subsidiary companies.

In 2010 Kelly commissioned the National Museum of Wales to create an exact replica of a historic Catholic book secretly produced in a cave in north Wales in 1586 as a gift from the people of Wales for Pope Benedict XVI. This was presented to the Pope at a Mass in Westminster Cathedral during his 2010 UK visit.

During his tenure, The Universe Media Group also published The Catholic Times , The Official Catholic Directory of England & Wales, The Catholic Who's Who, Church & Heritage Building Journal, Novena, Vatican: Past and Present, From the Catholic Archives and a large number of other third party Catholic titles. In 2010 it was the official publisher and distributor for a number of UK papal visit publications and resources, including Heart to Heart, Welcome Pope Benedict, and the Official Papal Mass Book. In September 2018 it also published the Official Mass Book for Adoremus, the 2018 National Eucharistic Congress in Liverpool.
In January 2021 thousands of churches across England and Wales closed due to Covid pandemic restrictions. In June 2021 it was announced that The Universe was to cease printing. A statement from the company said that the closure of churches during the pandemic was a "devastating blow" because they were the main source of distribution for the publications, and the widespread closures saw "a number of immediate cancellations, a reduction in parish payments and a fall in advertising revenue".

The Universe and Catholic Times finally closed at the end of June 2021 after an unsuccessful appeal for help by chairman Clive Leach. The Universe Media Group also became insolvent. HE Cardinal Vincent Nichols expressed his sadness at the closure of the newspaper, which he said was a ‘sign of the times'.

=== Relaunch ===
In September 2021, two months after "The Universe" closed, several members of the team behind the original paper launched a digital publication called Universe Catholic Weekly with former Universe news editor Michael Winterbottom taking over as the publication's editor. Starting on 19 May 2023 it was relaunched as a printed newspaper. Cardinal Vincent Nichols supported the initiative: "I congratulate the Universe on extending this means of communication and also helping to stimulate conversation, reflection and prayer. I hope that even more Catholics will now be able to support this new initiative, which has my wholehearted support."

The newspaper published its final issue on July 26, 2024.

== Editors ==
- 1860. Archibald Dunn
- 1900. W. Dunbar McConnell
- 1906-1909. George Elliot Anstruther
- 1917-?. Herbert Dean
- 1930s. Maurice Quinlan
- 1976-?. Terence Wyn
- 1981-1984 Rowane Pasco
- 1988-1990 Tom Murphy
- 1990-1994. Ann Knowles
- 1995-2021. Joseph Anthony Kelly
- 2021-2024. Michael Winterbottom
