= Dublin Builder =

Irish trade magazine

The Dublin Builder was an illustrated Irish architectural, engineering, mechanics' and sanitary trade magazine published from 1859 to 1866. It later became known as The Irish Builder.

Historical copies of the Dublin Builder, dating back to 1859, are available to search and view in digitised form at The British Newspaper Archive.

== List of Dublin Builder editions available free online ==
- Dublin Builder (1859) - v1
- Dublin Builder (1860) - v2
- Dublin Builder (1861) - v3
- Dublin Builder (1862) - v4
- Dublin Builder (1863) - v5
- Dublin Builder (1864) - v6
- Dublin Builder (1865) - v7
- Dublin Builder (1866) - v8
