= PC Live! =

Digital lifestyle magazine from the Republic of Ireland

- Categories: Digital lifestyle magazines
- Frequency: Monthly
- First issue: 1994
- Final issue: 2011
- Company: Mediateam
- Country: Ireland
- Language: English
- Website: pclive.ie
- ISSN: 1393-0591

PC Live! was a digital lifestyle magazine from the Republic of Ireland edited and produced by the publishing company Mediateam in Dublin.

PC Live! was first published in 1994 by the Scope Communications Group and later by Mediateam, a company formed when Scope merged with Computer Publications Group in 2005. The magazine was aimed at readers with an interest in computer hardware, software, home entertainment, personal technology and gaming.

A number of editors worked on PC Live! during its run, including Paul Healy (1994–95), John Collins (1996–2000), Stephen Cawley (2000–2007) and, finally, Niall Kitson (2007–2011).

PC Live! ceased publication with its April/May 2011 issue.

Mediateam still publishes two other ICT titles. ComputerScope is an end user ICT magazine. Irish Computer is a separate ICT magazine bundled with ComputerScope for trade and channel readers. An online presence is maintained through the news and analysis website TechCentral.ie, and a podcast made in association with Digital Audio Productions.

Outside of ICT, MediaTeam publishes Shelflife, an FMCG title, and The Irish Garden.

Mediateam is a member of Magazines Ireland (formerly the Periodical Publishers Association of Ireland), a professional body whose members are the major magazine publishers in the Republic of Ireland. PC Live! was nominated in the Best Specialist Consumer Magazine category at the 2007, 2009 PPAI Awards and 2010 Magazines Ireland Awards.
