= John Fergus O'Hea =

Irish political cartoonist

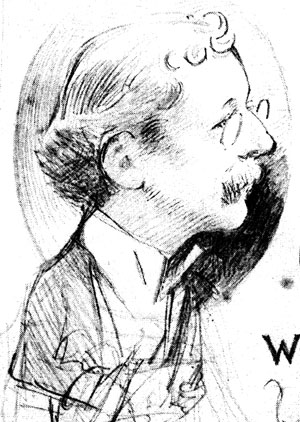
- Self-caricature (1897)
- Born: c. 1838; Cork, Ireland
- Died: 2 September 1922; London, England
- Occupation: Political cartoonist

John Fergus O'Hea (c. 1838 – 2 September 1922) was an Irish political cartoonist who sometimes published under the pseudonym Spex. Born in Cork, he was the son of James O'Hea, a barrister who was active in the Young Ireland movement and had been secretary to Daniel O'Connell. He attended the Cork School of Design, and painted trade union banners for Cork parades in the 1860s, 70s and 80s.

As a cartoonist, his early work appeared in the Dublin Weekly News, a nationalist newspaper, in the late 1860s. In 1870 he co-founded the humorous magazine Zozimus, an Irish answer to Punch, with journalist Alexander Martin Sullivan. O'Hea was chief artist and drew the covers. In its second year Richard Dowling became editor. Other cartoonists who contributed included Harry Furniss and Wallis Mackay. O'Hea also drew cartoons for the European Civiliser in the early 1870s. In 1872, after Zozimus folded, he moved to London and contributed to an Irish-run magazine called Tomahawk, which only lasted a few issues.

Back in Dublin in 1874, O'Hea, Dowling and Edwin Hamilton founded Ireland's Eye. After the style of Vanity Fair, each issue featured a colour caricature of a notable person, drawn by O'Hea under the name "Spex". Two editions of each issue were published, one at 6d with the cartoon in colour, the other at 3d with the cartoon in black and white. Ireland's Eye closed in 1876, after which O'Hea and Hamilton revived Zozimus as Zoz. O'Hea drew a full or double page cartoon in each issue until it too folded two years later. In 1879 O'Hea and Hamilton launched a new magazine, Pat, which ran until 1883 and also featured cartoons by Thomas Fitzpatrick.

In the 1880s O'Hea contributed a large colour weekly political cartoon to the Weekly Freeman, a weekly nationalist newspaper. He also drew cartoons for The Nation, and created poster-sized lithographs for the Christmas issues of magazines such as the Shamrock, Young Ireland and The Sunshine. He was on staff at the Weekly Freeman from 1893 to 1896. In January 1897 he delivered an illustrated lecture on "Irish Caricaturists and Cartoonists" to the Irish Literary Society in London.

For a time O'Hea was manager of the pictorial department of the Evening Telegraph. He lived in London from the 1893 until his death. Towards the end of his career, in 1914–15, he drew cartoons for Thomas Fitzpatrick's magazine The Lepracaun, during Fitzpatrick's final illness.

O'Hea's talents were highly regarded, even by those who did not share his nationalist politics. In 1883 the conservative British journal St. Stephen's Review described O'Hea as an "out-and-out nationalist", but also as "one of the cleverest artists in the three kingdoms" who "could be making his thousands per annum if he cared to live in London, where he is well known and highly thought of;" instead he "draws his most marvellous cartoons for the most miserable of Irish comic papers." In 1890 William Ewart Gladstone gave "a high testimony to the ability and principle of the Weekly Freeman artist" and described his pencil as "directly guided by a spirit of patriotism".

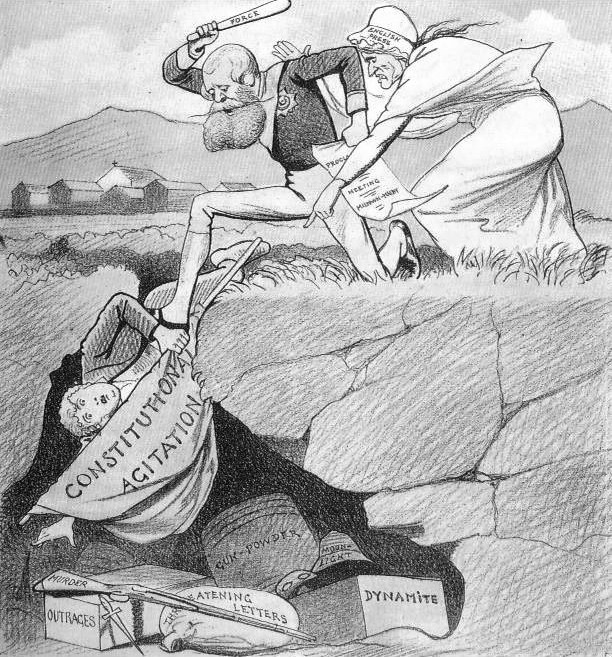
Cartoon from the Weekly Freeman, 1883

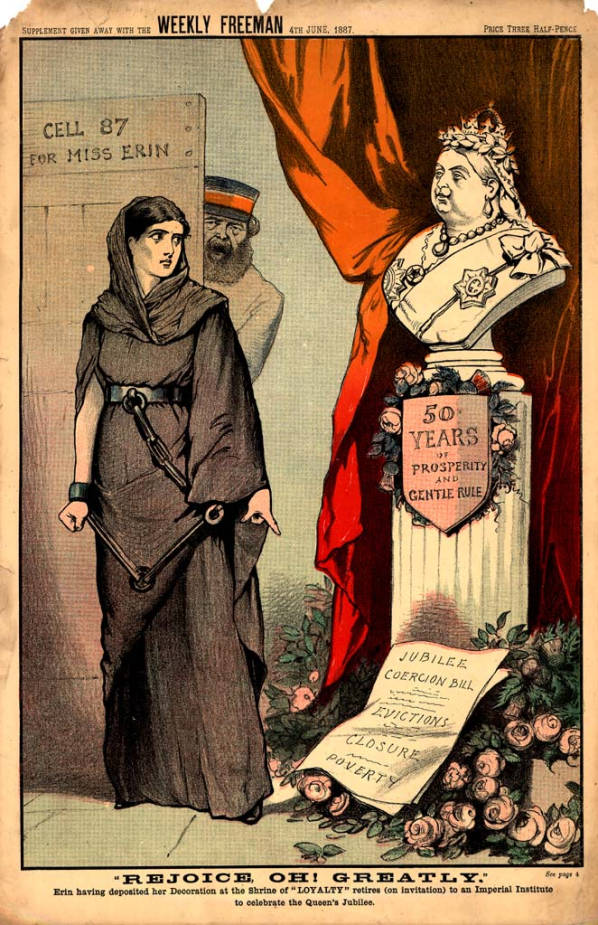
Cartoon from the Weekly Freeman, 1887
