= Business Plus (magazine) =

Irish business magazine established in 1998

Business Plus is an Irish business magazine published in Dublin by Nalac Limited. The magazine was established in 1998. It is published monthly and its circulation was 10,660 (ABC) copies in 2006. Its editor is Nick Mulcahy, son of proprietor of The Phoenix, John Mulcahy. It has ISSN 1393-5712.
