= Face Up (magazine) =

Irish Catholic magazine for teenagers

Face Up was a Catholic magazine targeted at teenagers published by Redemptorist Communications, which was administered by the Redemptorists of Ireland. It existed between February 2001 and April 2014.

== History and profile ==
The magazine began in February 2001 and was published monthly. It was aimed at readers ages 15–18. Its slogan was "for teens who want something deeper". Each magazine had a distribution of approximately 13,000 copies and a readership of 40,000.

Face Up ceased publication in April 2014 due to low readership.

== Editorial stance ==
In keeping with its Redemptorist background, the magazine advocated an active Christian ethos. Issues raised included career choices, how to handle bullying, loneliness, and making life-enhancing decisions. Face Up worked in partnership with other agencies seeking to support young people. In 2001, Deborah Grant of the Irish Independent described it as a "modest and smut-free teen publication", but not "overtly Christian or preachy". She questioned whether it would appeal to young people, as in her view it lacked "glamour and hot celebrity scoops".
