= Mongrel (magazine) =

Arts, culture and news magazine

Mongrel issue 15

Mongrel was an arts, culture and news magazine published nationwide in Ireland between 2003 and 2008. Founded by Sam Bungey and Yousef Eldin, Mongrel published 38 issues, and known for its irreverent editorial and production printed in full colour with perfect binding.

The magazine ran a number of high-profile cover stories. Profiles included in the magazine included former Irish Taoiseach Bertie Ahern, George Galloway, and Ron Paul. Musicians interviewed include My Morning Jacket, M.I.A., The Republic of Loose, Rufus Wainwright, and Wayne Coyne of The Flaming Lips. Features included a look at the reborn doll industry and a guide to going bald.

Mongrel was embroiled in controversy in 2005 for its publication of "The Cunts List", which ranked notable people and organisations who were unlikable or morally reprehensible in the view of the magazine. The story was featured on the cover of The Sun when Irish chat show host Pat Kenny slammed the publishers as "low-life" in response to the article, which branded Kenny a "shithead and a moron".

The magazine's contributors included a number of Ireland's leading young names in writing, photography, illustration, styling, and graphic design.

Mongrel closed in February 2008 with the last issue's cover design inspired by an Irish Mass card often sent at funerals.
