= Building Giants (magazine) =

Indian quarterly magazine

Building Giants (ISSN 2455-6408) is an Indian quarterly magazine registered under Registrar of Newspapers for India in 2010. The magazine is published by ABS Publication, which is a part of ABS Group of companies based out of Indore in Central India. It primarily focuses on the emerging trends in architectural world. It is a magazine for architects and related professionals. Building Giants documents significant architecture and design from across the world and features articles on current practice, building technology, interior designs and social issues affecting architecture.

Building Giants issues are usually a mix of design ideas and trends, building science, business and professional strategies, exploration of key issues, new products and computer-aided practice architecture and design, new wave furniture designs and ideas.

== History ==
Chief Editor	Anis Qureshi
Categories	Architecture & Interior
Frequency	Quarterly
Total Circulation	30,000
Year Founded	2010
Company	ABS Publication
Country	India
Based in	Indore
Language	English
Website	www.buildinggiants.co.in

ABS group of companies is consisting of four companies, absIT focusing on software development; DesignLab International, for 3D rendering and visualisation, ABS Arch which provides architectural libraries and ABS Publication which publishes Building Giants. In the year 2015, Building Giants started inviting guest editors to publish a theme based magazine. Most of their guest editors are renowned architects, academicians and designers who suggest a theme for the issue. According to Anis Qureshi (Editor-in-Chief), "The idea behind inviting a panel of guest editor is to showcase their architectural and design philosophy to readers, and provide an opportunity to publish the works of other leading architects and designers on the same theme."

== Editors-in-chief ==
- Anis P. Qureshi

== Editors ==
- Kanika Mehata
- Aniket Pradhan

== Guest editors ==
- Architect Habeeb Khan, Nagpur, India
- Architect Smita Khan, Nagpur, India
- Massimiliano Fuksas
- Doriana Fuksas], Paris, France
- Architect Sanjay Mohe, Bangalore, India
- Architect Manish Kumat, Indore, India
- Architect Manish Banker, Pune, India
- Architect. Sanjay Patil
- Architect. Bidisha Sinha
