= Construct Ireland =

- Editor: Jeff Colley
- Categories: Sustainable building
- Frequency: Bi-monthly
- Total circulation: 7,458 (ABC Jul 2008/Jul 2009)
- Founded: 2003
- Final issue: 2012
- Company: Temple Media
- Country: Ireland
- Language: English
- Website: constructireland.ie

Construct Ireland was an Irish magazine focusing on sustainable and ecological architecture and construction. It was first published in January 2003. Due to a decision by the publishers to rebrand and expand internationally, the title was discontinued in 2012, with the final issue being published in August of that year. The rebranded magazine was launched in October 2012, under the title Passive House Plus.

== Editors and contributors ==
=== Editor ===
Jeff Colley

=== Deputy editor ===
Lenny Antonelli

=== Regular contributors ===
- John Hearne
- Richard Douthwaite (1942–2011)

== Campaigns ==
The magazine campaigned on green issues, including BER certificates and NAMA.

== Other ==
In addition to newsstand and direct sales, free copies were distributed to all ÉASCA member. Total circulation was 7,458 between July 2008 and July 2009.

There is now a new Mobile app launched May 2020 named Construct Ireland which provides Construction Job Alerts Across Ireland
