= List of people diagnosed with colorectal cancer =

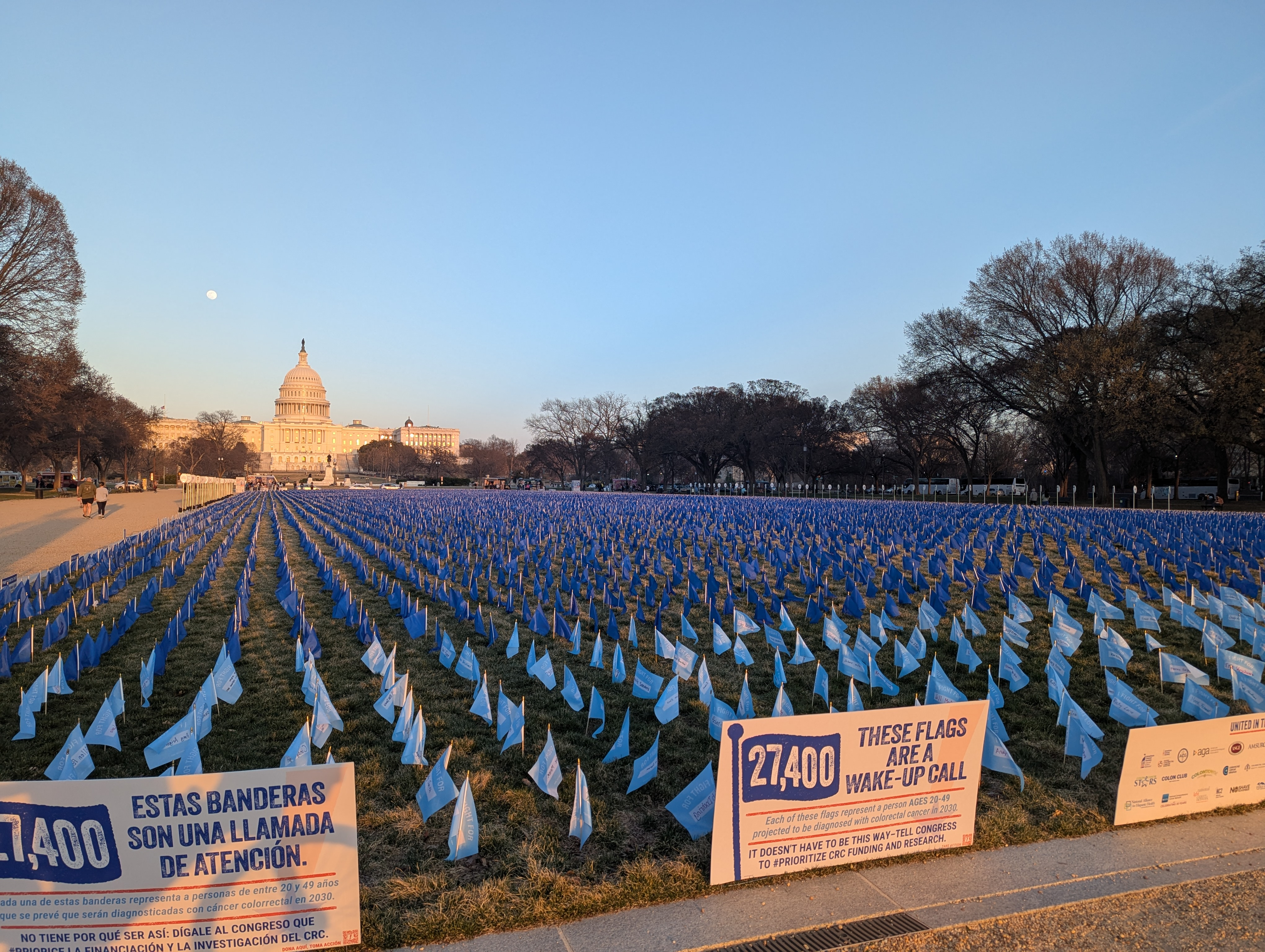
27,400 flags planted on the National Mall in for National Colon Cancer Awareness Month 2025, representing the estimated number of people who will be diagnosed with colorectal cancer in 2030, as part of a campaign to secure research funding for the disease.

This article lists notable people who died from or were diagnosed with colorectal cancer. Those still living are marked in bold.

- **Adele Roberts** (born 1979), English broadcaster, radio personality and DJ.
- Adi Bitar (1924–1973; aged 48), Palestinian-Jordanian judge and author of the Constitution of the United Arab Emirates.
- Alto Reed (1948–2020; aged 72), American saxophonist best known as a long-time member of Bob Seger and the Silver Bullet Band.
- André Kim (1935–2010; aged 74), South Korean fashion designer. Died a week after being hospitalized at the Seoul National University Hospital from pneumonia complications.
- Angela Scoular (1945–2011; aged 65), British actress.
- **Angus MacDonald** (born 1992), English professional footballer.
- Antonin Artaud (1896–1948; aged 51), French dramatist, poet, essayist, actor, and theatre director; died from an overdose of chloral hydrate his doctor prescribed to control the pain from a very advanced and inoperable cancer.
- Aribert Heim (1914–1992; aged 78), Former Austrian Schutzstaffel (SS) doctor, known as "Doctor Death", who served at the Mauthausen-Gusen concentration camp during World War II. His death in 1992 was confirmed by a German court in Baden-Baden.
- Babe Didrikson Zaharias (1911–1956; aged 45), American athlete.
- **Ben Richards** (born 1972), English actor.
- Billy Kametz (1987–2022; aged 35), American voice actor.
- Ben Kean (1912–1993; aged 81), American physician, author, researcher, and professor at Weill Cornell Medicine in New York City. Personal doctor of Mohammad Reza Pahlavi, the former Shah of Iran from 1941 to 1979.
- Bhupinder Singh (1940–2022; aged 82), Indian ghazal singer. He died from COVID-19 during the COVID-19 pandemic in India a week after being hospitalized for urine infection, with colon cancer being a suspected cause of his death.
- Bob Jenkins (1947–2021; aged 73), American television and radio sports announcer.
- Bobby Moore (1941–1993; aged 51), England football captain and 1966 World Cup winner; the **Bobby Moore Fund for Cancer Research UK** is committed to beating bowel cancer in his memory.
- Brion Gysin (1916–1986; aged 70), British-Canadian writer and painter. Diagnosed in 1974 and underwent a colostomy; died from lung cancer in 1986.
- **Carmen Marc Valvo** (born 1963), American fashion designer.
- Bruno Ganz (1941–2019; aged 77), Swiss actor.
- Catherine O'Hara (1954–2026; aged 71), Canadian and American actress, comedian, and screenwriter. She died from pulmonary embolism with an underlying cause of cancer.
- Chadwick Boseman (1976–2020; aged 43), American actor.
- Charles Manson (1934–2017; aged 83), American criminal and cult leader who led the Manson Family. Died from cardiac arrest resulting from respiratory failure.
- Charles M. Schulz (1922–2000; aged 77), creator of Peanuts; died 60 days after diagnosis.
- Christodoulos of Athens (1939-2008; aged 69), Greek primate who served as Archbishop of Athens. Diagnosed with colon and liver cancer following a hospitalization in June 2007, and later died at his home in January 2008 in Psychiko, including after a aborted liver transplant.
- Claude Debussy (1862–1918; aged 55), French composer.
- Clyde Kennard (1927–1963; aged 36), American Korean War veteran and civil rights activist. Diagnosed in 1961 while in prison and released two years later on parole in 1963. He died that same year in July of the disease.
- Corazon Aquino (1933–2009; aged 76), 11th President of the Philippines (1986–1992).
- Dana Dawson (1974–2010; aged 36), American actress and singer.
- **Darryl Strawberry** (born 1962), American former professional baseball right fielder who played 17 seasons in Major League Baseball (MLB). First diagnosed during the 1998 ALDS and made a comeback the following year after cancer treatment. Also survived a cancer recurrence in 2000 that spread to his lymph and kidney.
- Dame Deborah James (1981–2022; aged 40), English journalist and podcast presenter.
- Dirk Kempthorne (1951–2026; aged 74), former Idaho politician who served as U.S. Senator from 1993 to 1999, 30th Governor of Idaho from 1999 to 2006, and Interior Secretary under president George W. Bush from 2006 to 2009. Died a year after his diagnosis.
- Donald Conroy (1921–1998; aged 77), U.S. Marine colonel who served in World War II, Korean War, and Vietnam War.
- Donald McEachin (2022; aged 61), American politician who served as U.S. representative for Virginia's 4th congressional district. Attended a premiere for Black Panther: Wakanda Forever to advocate for screenings earlier in the month prior to his death.
- Eartha Kitt (1927–2008; aged 81), American singer and actress.
- Eitan Haber (1940–2020; aged 80), Israeli journalist and publicist who served as an adviser to Israeli Prime Minister Yitzhak Rabin and also known for announcing Rabin's death in the wake of his assassination.
- Sir Edward Elgar (1857–1934; aged 76), English composer.
- Queen Elizabeth The Queen Mother (1900–2002; aged 101), British Queen Consort of King George VI and mother of Queen Elizabeth II and Princess Margaret, Countess of Snowdon. She was diagnosed with colon cancer in 1966 at the age of 66 and surgery removed a tumour; she survived and died 35 years later in 2002, aged 101, from natural causes.
- Elizabeth Montgomery (1933–1995; aged 62), American actress.
- **Eric Davis** (born 1962), American former Major League Baseball (MLB) center fielder. Diagnosed in 1997 and underwent surgery along with 32 weeks of chemotherapy. He returned to the Baltimore Orioles lineup that same year.
- **Erik Jensen** (born 1970), American actor, playwright, screenwriter, and director. Diagnosed with stage IV colon cancer in October 2023 and was declared cancer free a year later after his doctors found no evidence of disease. He also survived a brain aneurysm in 2021.
- Estelle Bennett (1941–2009; aged 67), American singer.
- Ferdinand I of Naples (1424–1494; aged 70), King of Naples from 1458 to 1494. Mummified remains discovered in 2006 that he died from colorectal cancer.
- Forrest Gregg (1933–2019; aged 85), American professional football player and coach who played offensive tackle for 16 seasons in the National Football League with the Green Bay Packers and Dallas Cowboys. He was diagnosed with colon cancer in 2001 and successfully underwent treatment, having previously overcome melanoma in 1976. He later died from Parkinson's disease in 2019, eight years after his 2011 diagnosis.
- Gary Cooper (1901–1961; aged 60), American actor. Diagnosed with prostate cancer in 1960 which metastasized to his colon. He also had surgery to remove a tumor from his intestine. Died in 1961 after a battle with both prostate and colon cancer.
- George Alagiah (1955–2023; aged 67), British newsreader, journalist and television presenter.
- Gerald Gallego (1946–2002; aged 56), American serial killer and husband of Charlene Williams
- Gilberto Rodríguez Orejuela (1939–2022; aged 83), Colombian drug lord and leader of the Cali Cartel. He was diagnosed with colorectal cancer and also had prostate cancer, COVID-19, and two heart attacks while serving a prison sentence.
- Gioacchino Antonio Rossini (1792-1868; aged 76) Italian opera composer of the romantic era. Died after a short illness and an unsuccessful operation to treat colon cancer.
- **Grace Lore**, Canadian politician who has served as a member of the Legislative Assembly of British Columbia (MLA) representing the riding of Victoria-Beacon Hill since 2020. Diagnosed in November 2024 and stepped back from her cabinet duties, with Premier David Eby confirming Jodie Wickens would step in.
- Harold Wilson (1916–1995; aged 79), British politician who served as Prime Minister of the United Kingdom (1964–1970, 1974–1976). He also suffered from Alzheimer's disease, likely showing the first signs in 1976.
- Herbert Hoover (1874–1964; aged 90), American businessman and politician who served as the 31st President of the United States from 1929 to 1933.
- Herman Cain (1945–2020; aged 74), American businessman, Republican political figure, and candidate for the Republican nomination in the 2012 United States presidential election. Diagnosed with stage IV colon cancer in 2006, and successfully treated into remission. He later died from complications of COVID-19 in 2020 during the pandemic.
- Howard Marks (1945–2016; aged 70), Welsh drug smuggler and author.
- Hugo Pratt (1927–1995; aged 68), Italian cartoonist.
- Infanta Pilar, Duchess of Badajoz (1936–2020; aged 83), Spanish royal. Elder daughter of Infante Juan, Count of Barcelona and Princess María de las Mercedes of Bourbon-Two Sicilies, and older sister of King Juan Carlos I.
- Jackie Gleason (1916–1987; aged 71), American actor and entertainer.
- James Van Der Beek (1977–2026; aged 48), American actor.
- **Jamie Raskin** (born 1962), American attorney, law professor, and politician serving as the U.S. representative for Maryland's 8th congressional district since 2017. Diagnosed in 2010 and successfully treated.
- **Jeff Ross** (born 1965), American stand-up comedian, actor, director and producer. Diagnosed with stage III colon cancer in 2024 at an early-stage despite experiencing no symptoms, and had seven inches of his colon removed and underwent six months of chemotherapy. He has since then been cancer free.
- **Dame Joan Bakewell** (born 1933), English broadcaster, journalist, television presenter and Labour Party peer.
- Joel Siegel (1943–2007; aged 63), Emmy award-winning film critic and Entertainment Editor of ABC's Good Morning America.
- John Foster Dulles (1888–1959; aged 71), United States Secretary of State under Republican President Dwight D. Eisenhower.
- John Mann (1962–2019; aged 57), Canadian rock musician, songwriter and actor. Died from early-onset Alzheimer's disease.
- John Wetton (1949–2017; aged 67), British singer-songwriter.
- **Joaquín Caparrós** (born 1955), Spanish football manager. Diagnosed with colon cancer in June 2026 after previously being diagnosed with chronic leukemia in 2019.
- José Ferrer (1912–1992; aged 80), Puerto Rican actor, director and film director.
- John Bain (1984–2018; aged 33), English video gaming commentator and game critic, known as "TotalBiscuit".
- Jon Roberts (1948–2011; aged 63), American drug trafficker
- **Dame Julie Walters** (born 1950), English actress.
- Kane Tanaka (1903–2022; aged 119), Japanese supercentenarian. Diagnosed in 2006 at 103 years old and underwent surgery. Went on to live for 16 more years and died of old age.
- Keith Reid (1946–2023; aged 76), English lyricist and songwriter.
- Kenneth D. Taylor (1934–2015; aged 81), Canadian diplomat, educator and businessman known for his role in the Canadian Caper during the Iran hostage crisis as Canadian ambassador to Iran.
- Kevin Conroy (1955–2022; aged 66), American voice actor.
- Kevin Corcoran (1949–2015; aged 66), American director, and producer who took part in various Disney films as a child actor.
- **Kevin Seefried** (born 1969 or 1970), American drywall mechanic and convicted felon who carried the Confederate battle flag during the January 6 riot at the United States Capitol. His attorney stated during sentencing that he was recovering from rectal cancer and wears a colostomy bag.
- Kirstie Alley (1951–2022; aged 71), American actress.
- Kim Yong-nam (1928-2025; aged 97), North Korean politician and diplomat who served as president of the Presidium of the Supreme People's Assembly from 1998 to 2019. Reportedly received treatment for colon cancer according to Korean Central News Agency. Died from multiple organ failures related to the cancer.
- **Kornbread Jeté** (born 1992), American drag queen. Diagnosed with adenocarcinoma in 2022 aged 30.
- Lana Peters (1926–2011, aged 85), Daughter of former Soviet Union leader Joseph Stalin.
- Lois Maxwell (1927–2007; aged 80), Canadian actress.
- Luis Alvarez (1966–2019; aged 53), former New York City Police Department detective and first responder during the September 11 attacks.
- Lynn Faulds Wood (1948–2020; aged 72), Scottish television presenter and journalist. Survived advanced bowel cancer and founded the charities Beating Bowel Cancer and Lynn's Bowel Cancer Campaign. She later died from a stroke in 2020.
- Malcolm Marshall (1958–1999; aged 41), West Indian-British cricket player.
- **Mark Gastineau** (born 1956), American former professional football defensive end who played in the National Football League (NFL) for 10 seasons with the New York Jets. Revealed his cancer diagnosis in March 2019, and finished treatment in June. Additionally, he also was diagnosed with dementia, Parkinson's disease, and Alzheimer's disease.
- Matteo Messina Denaro (1962–2023; aged 61), Italian mafia boss.
- Michael Joseph Savage (1872–1940; aged 68), New Zealand politician who served as the 23rd Prime Minister from 1935 until his death in 1940.
- Mike Fitzpatrick (1963–2020; aged 56), Former U.S. congressman of Pennsylvania's 8th congressional district. Diagnosed with stage III colon cancer in 2008, and went into remission five months after doing chemotherapy. Died from melanoma in 2020 at age 56.
- **Mike Fremont** (born 1922; aged 104), American runner and centenarian. Diagnosed with colon cancer at age 69 and adopted a plant-based diet. He later had the tumour removed with no evidence of spread, and has since lived into his 100s.
- **Morgan Freeman** (born 1937), actor, producer, and narrator. Diagnosed with stage I colon cancer in 2010 and successfully removed the tumor.
- Morgan Tsvangirai (1952–2018; aged 65), Zimbabwean politician and opposition leader who served as Prime Minister of Zimbabwe from 2009 to 2013.
- Moshe Dayan (1915–1981; aged 66), Israeli military commander and Defense Minister during the Six-Day War and Yom Kippur War. Diagnosed with colon cancer in 1979 and underwent an operation to remove the tumor, which involved the removal of a small portion of his colon. He later died in 1981 from a heart attack.
- Neville Chamberlain (1869–1940; aged 71), British politician who served as Prime Minister of the United Kingdom (1937–1940).
- Nick Lloyd Webber (1979–2023; aged 43), English composer, record producer and son of Andrew Lloyd Webber.
- Nika McGuigan (1986–2019; aged 33), Northern Irish actress.
- Noele Gordon (1919–1985; aged 65), English actress.
- Norma Tanega (1939–2019; aged 80), American folk and pop singer-songwriter, painter, and experimental musician.
- Norodom Sihanouk (1922–2012; aged 89), Cambodian politician who served as King, Chief of State, and Prime Minister. Died in 2012 from a heart attack after receiving medical treatment and having a variety of health conditions, including colon cancer, b-cell lymphoma, hypertension, and diabetes.
- Patrick Fyffe (1942–2002; aged 60), English female impersonator and comic actor.
- Pelé (1940–2022; aged 82), former Brazilian footballer for Santos FC, New York Cosmos and Brazil.
- Pete Gray (1980–2011; aged 30), Australian environmental activist who threw his shoes at former Prime Minister John Howard during a Q&A in protest of Australia’s role in the Iraq War.
- Peter Adamson (1930–2002; aged 71), English actor. He successfully underwent surgery for bowel cancer in 1990, however died from colorectal cancer in 2002.
- Omar Bongo (1935–2009; aged 73), Gabonese politician who served as President of Gabon from 1967 until his death in 2009 in Spain.
- Qaboos bin Said (1940–2020; aged 79), Sultan of Oman from 1970 to 2020.
- Robert Reed (1932–1992; aged 59), American actor. Diagnosed with colon lymphoma in November 1991, dying 6 months later from the cancer which was worsened by HIV.
- Robin Gibb (1949–2012; aged 62), Manx singer, musician and producer, member of the Bee Gees.
- Rod Roddy (1937–2003; aged 66), American radio and television announcer (The Price is Right); died two years after being diagnosed with colon cancer.
- Ron Duguay (1957-2026), Canadian former professional ice hockey player and coach who played 12 seasons in the National Hockey League (NHL) from 1977 through 1989.
- Ronald Reagan (1911–2004; aged 93), American politician who served as the 40th President of the United States (1981–1989). In 1985, Reagan underwent surgery at Bethesda Naval Hospital, he had a right Hemicolectomy, he had two foot of colon removed. This was found to be a Dukes' Stage B colorectal cancer. He was later diagnosed with Alzheimer's disease in August 1994, and died from pneumonia complications related to the disease in 2004.
- Rupiah Banda (1937–2022; aged 85), Zambian politician who served as the fourth President of Zambia from 2008 to 2011.
- Russi Taylor (1944–2019; aged 75), American voice actress best known as the voice of Minnie Mouse.
- Ruth Bader Ginsburg (1933-2020; aged 87), American jurist, Associate Justice of the U.S. Supreme Court. Diagnosed with colon cancer in 1999. Died in 2020 from pancreatic cancer at age 87.
- Ruth Handler (1916–2002; aged 85), American businesswoman and creator of Barbie and Nearly Me prosthetics.
- Sam Simon (1955–2015; aged 59), American director, producer, writer, philanthropist and co-creator of The Simpsons.
- **Sam Taylor-Johnson** (born 1967), English filmmaker, director and photographer.
- Sara Murray Jordan (1884–1959; aged 75), American gastroenterologist. Diagnosed herself with colon cancer and died in 1959.
- Sean Grayson (1992-2026; aged 32), American deputy police officer found guilty for the 2024 murder of Sonya Massey. He was reportedly diagnosed with stage III colon cancer in fall 2023 prior to Massey's killing, and his cancer later progressed to stage IV. He would later die from the disease in prison three years after his diagnosis.
- **Sharon Osbourne** (born 1952), British-American television personality and music manager.
- Sid Waddell (1940–2012; aged 72), English sports commentator and television personality, known as the "Voice of Darts".
- Simon MacCorkindale (1952–2010; aged 58), British actor and film director; first diagnosed in 2006.
- Sonya Biddle (1957–2022; aged 64), Canadian actress and politician in Montreal, Quebec. She served on the Montreal City Council from 1998 to 2001 as a Member of Vision Montreal.
- **Stephen Garcia** (born 1988), former collegiate American football quarterback for the University of South Carolina. Diagnosed with Stage IV colon cancer in April 2026, and was declared cancer free in November.
- Sultan bin Abdulaziz al Saud (1925–2011; aged 86), Saudi Arabian Defense Minister from 1963 to 2011 and Crown Prince from 2005 to 2011. Diagnosed in 2004, and also suffered from dementia, specifically Alzheimer's disease.
- **Tamisha Iman** (born 1970), American drag queen.
- Tammy Faye Messner (1942–2007; aged 65), American evangelist.
- Tanner Martin (1994-2025; aged 30), American social media influencer from Utah. Diagnosed with Stage IV colon cancer in 2020 at age 25. He died from the disease five years later after posting a pre-recorded TikTok video announcing his own passing.
- **Taylor Dayne** (born 1962), American singer. Diagnosed in July 2022, underwent surgery to remove 10 inches of her colon, and was declared cancer-free.
- Ted Kaczynski (1942-2023; aged 81), American domestic terrorist known as the “Unabomber”. Reportedly diagnosed with stage IV rectal cancer in March 2021 and stopped treatment in March 2023. Died by suicide by hanging in prison.
- Terry Jones (1942-2020; aged 77), Welsh actor, comedian, director, historian, writer and member of the Monty Python comedy troupe. Diagnosed in 2006, underwent surgery, and declared cancer free a year later. Died from dementia complications.
- **Trey Mancini** (born 1992), American professional baseball first baseman, outfielder, and designated hitter. Diagnosed with stage III colon cancer in 2020 while a member of the Baltimore Orioles; he missed the entire 2020 season during treatment. He completed chemotherapy in November 2020 and was declared cancer-free, returning in 2021 and being named American League Comeback Player of the Year.
- Tina Turner (1939–2023; aged 83), American-Swiss singer and actress.
- Tom Coburn (1948–2020; aged 72), Former American Republican politician and physician. Served as a United States representative from 1995 to 2001 and a United States senator from Oklahoma from 2005 to 2015. Diagnosed with colon cancer in 2003, he underwent surgery and chemotherapy. He also survived melanoma, but died in 2020 following a recurrence of prostate cancer.
- Tony Snow (1955–2008; aged 53), American journalist and politician who served as the 25th White House Press Secretary under President George W. Bush.
- Vince Lombardi (1913–1970; aged 57), American football coach of Green Bay Packers and Washington Redskins. The Super Bowl trophy was renamed in his honor shortly after his death. Died 70 days after diagnosis.
- **Vince Papale** (born 1946), former American football wide receiver who played three seasons for the Philadelphia Eagles. His story was the inspiration of the 2006 film Invincible. He was diagnosed with colon cancer in 2001 after his family physician detected hidden blood in the stool during a routine exam. Following encouragement from his wife, Janet, he underwent screening for the disease. A laparoscopic surgery was then performed in June of that year to remove 18 inches of his colon. He has been cancer-free since then and has become an advocate for early screenings.
- **Wade Hayes** (born 1969), American country music artist. Survived stage IV colon cancer twice, first diagnosed in 2011 and went into remission in 2012. Also survived a cancer recurrence in his lymph nodes.
