= Backer board =

Backer board may refer to:

- Cement board used as tile backer board (to support tiles)
- Cardboard used in the conservation of comic books to keep pages flat
