= Fiberglass mesh =

Fiberglass mesh is a neatly woven, crisscross pattern of fiberglass thread that is used to create new products such as tape and filters. When it is used as a filter, it is somewhat common for the manufacturer to spray a PVC coating to make it stronger and last longer. The most common place to find fiberglass mesh is in tape products.

== Uses ==
=== Drywall ===
Drywall finishers use the mesh frequently. In fact, it is common to replace the paper tape used to float the joint between two pieces of drywall. The mesh that drywall finishers use comes on a roll just like paper drywall tape. The added benefit for the drywall finisher is to roll out the mesh over a great distance before having to apply the first coat of joint compound. Not only does it help them in this manner, but it also causes a stronger bond between the joint compound, the tape and the wall.

Drywall finishers also use this tape to patch holes. The most common hole in the drywall generally occurs where a doorknob has hit a wall too many times. If it is only slightly damaged, a couple of short pieces of the tape will be formed into a square and placed over the hole. A joint compound will then be applied directly to it. If the hole is too large to patch with fiberglass mesh alone, a piece of metal flashing can be added behind the tape before applying joint compound.

=== Waterproofing ===
When used with waterproofing chemical products, fiberglass mesh is also used in the waterproofing of terraces, etc.

Construction work is not the only use for fiberglass mesh.

=== Water filters ===
As a filtering system, alkali resistant fiberglass mesh works really well. As the water flows through it, the mesh catches even the smallest impurities. In addition to this use, it can also be used as a mosquito net.

=== Personal protective equipment ===
Firefighters and others who work with dangerous chemicals may use fiberglass mesh in protective clothing. Firemen wear jackets made of tightly woven mesh when they are battling a fire. During firefighting, it keeps their clothing from catching fire. Among other things, fiberglass mesh can be used for mold making as well as for protection against corrosive chemicals.
