= José Miguel Borrego =

Mexican boxer (born 1998)

Personal information
- Full name: José Miguel Borrego Muñiz
- Born: 18 February 1998 (age 28) Aguascalientes, Aguascalientes, Mexico
- Height: 5 ft 9 in (175 cm)
- Weight: Light welterweight Welterweight

Boxing career
- Reach: 69 in (175 cm)
- Stance: Southpaw

Boxing record
- Total fights: 28
- Wins: 23
- Win by KO: 19
- Losses: 5

José Miguel Borrego Muñiz (born 18 February 1998) is a Mexican professional boxer. As an amateur, he competed at the 2013 Junior World Championships.

== Early life and amateur career ==
Borrego is a native of Colonia San Pablo in Aguascalientes, Aguascalientes. He started boxing in 2008 at the "La Chiquita González" gym under the tutelage of Ricardo Cummings Cruz. Borrego accompanied his brother to the gym despite not being interested in sports at the time. He soon changed his mind, saying he "fell in love" with the work and discipline needed to step in the ring.

As an amateur, Borrego won three gold medals at the Olimpiada Nacional (National Olympics) from 2011 to 2013, including two in the infantil menor category and one in infantil mayor. Following his 2013 win, he was invited to train at the Centro Nacional de Alto Rendimiento. Borrego was one of five athletes selected to represent Mexico at the 2013 Junior World Championships in Kyiv, Ukraine. He defeated Ramūnas Čebanauskas of Lithuania in his first bout, before falling to Englishman Jimmy Smith.

In his final amateur competition, Borrego competed at the 2015 Ringside World Championships in the youth men's category. He advanced to the light welterweight final, where he lost to Richardson Hitchins

== Professional career ==
Borrego made his professional debut on 23 October 2015. He defeated Alberto Acevedo via second-round technical knockout (TKO) at the Auditorio Héroes Potosinos in Matehuala, San Luis Potosí. On 18 November 2016, Borrego defeated Óscar Gutiérrez by second-round TKO in his hometown of Aguascalientes to claim the vacant WBC Youth Silver super lightweight title, improving his record to 10–0. The following month, he announced he was bringing on Al Haymon as an advisor.

In his next fight on 2 February 2017, Borrego made his U.S. debut against Thomas Mendez at the Horseshoe Casino in Tunica, Mississippi. He stopped Mendez in the first round, improving to 11–0. Borrego also fought at the Barclays Center in Brooklyn that April, beating John Delperdang via seventh-round TKO. It was the first time in his career that he went past the fifth round. Borrego scored another quick victory in June, stopping hometown favorite Kevin Watts in the fourth round of their bout on the undercard of a Premier Boxing Champions (PBC) event in Lancaster, California, and improving his record to 13–0. He was subsequently named the PBC Prospect of the Month for August 2017.

Borrego fought against fellow undefeated prospect Juan Heraldez on the undercard of Floyd Mayweather Jr. vs. Conor McGregor at the T-Mobile Arena in Paradise, Nevada, on 26 August 2017. Despite scoring a knockdown in the ninth round, he was handed his first career loss by unanimous decision, with the scorecards reading 97–92 (twice) and 96–93 in favor of Heraldez. The decision was met with boos from the crowd. It was later revealed that Borrego suffered a meniscus tear during the fight. He underwent surgery before his next fight, a fourth-round TKO win over Carlos Winston Velasquez in May.

Borrego headlined his first card on 22 September 2018, facing local gatekeeper Cameron Krael at the Sam's Town Hotel and Gambling Hall in Las Vegas. He lost the fight by majority decision, marking his second career defeat. Borrego won four consecutive fights from 2019 to 2020, including a third-round stoppage victory over Olympian Likar Ramos. He lost to Alan Sanchez via split decision in Plant City, Florida, on 1 May 2021, and lost again to undefeated prospect Peter Dobson via unanimous decision on 25 February 2022, also in Plant City, bringing his record to 19–4.

Borrego returned to the ring nearly two years later; he beat Diego Pérez Vigil via second-round stoppage in Aguascalientes on 3 November 2023, marking his first fight in Mexico since 2016. The following year, on 25 October 2024, Borrego handed Etoundi Michel William his first career loss, defeating the Ivorian-Brazilian via unanimous decision in Aguascalientes.

Borrego was scheduled to face Radzhab Butaev in Moscow on 19 July 2025 for the vacant WBA Intercontinental super-welterweight title, but the fight was scrapped.

On 22 July 2025, Borrego faced Vadim Musaev in Dushanbe, Tajikistan, for the vacant WBA Asia welterweight title. (Note: The fight was originally billed as being for the IBA Pro Intercontinental title.) He lost the bout by unanimous decision.

== Fighting style ==
A southpaw, Borrego is known for his aggressive style. He has described himself as a "come forward fighter", adding that "Mexican fighters are known for being warriors" and he wanted to "continue this trend".

== Personal life ==
Borrego has stated his idol is Juan Manuel Márquez.
