= Structural insulated panel =

Form of sandwich panel used as a building material

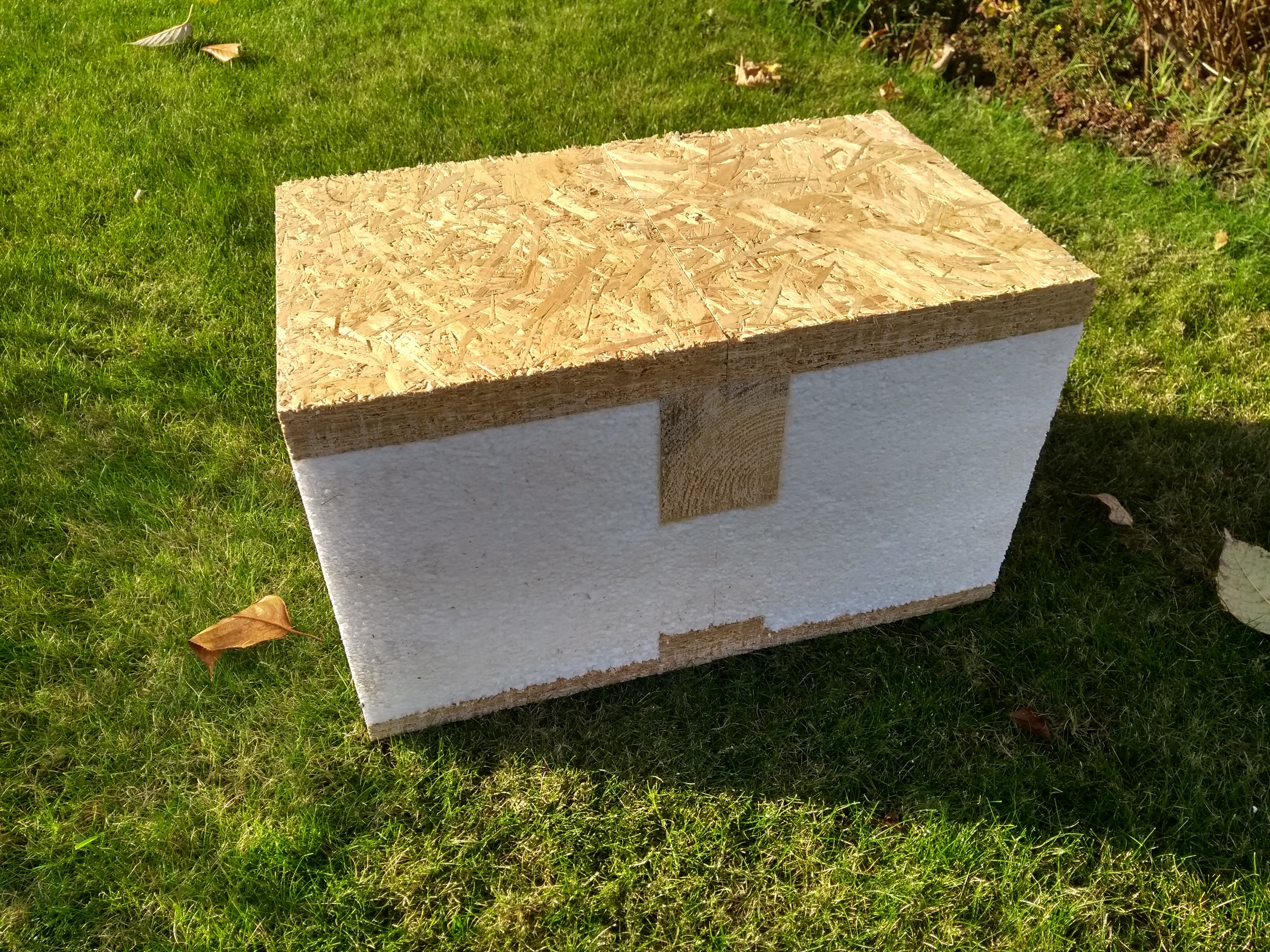
SIPs are most commonly made of OSB panels sandwiched around a foam core made of polystyrene.

A structural insulated panel, or structural insulating panel, (SIP), is a form of sandwich panel used as a building material in the construction industry.

SIP is a sandwich structured composite, consisting of an insulating layer of rigid core sandwiched between two layers of structural board. The board can be sheet metal, fibre cement, magnesium oxide board (MgO), plywood or oriented strand board (OSB), and the core can either be expanded polystyrene foam (EPS), extruded polystyrene foam (XPS), polyisocyanurate foam, polyurethane foam, or be composite honeycomb (HSC).

The sheathing accepts all tensile forces while the core material has to withstand only some compressive as well as shear forces.

In a SIP several components of conventional building, such as studs and joists, insulation, vapor barrier and air barrier can be combined. The panel can be used for many different applications, such as exterior wall, roof, floor and foundation systems.

== History ==
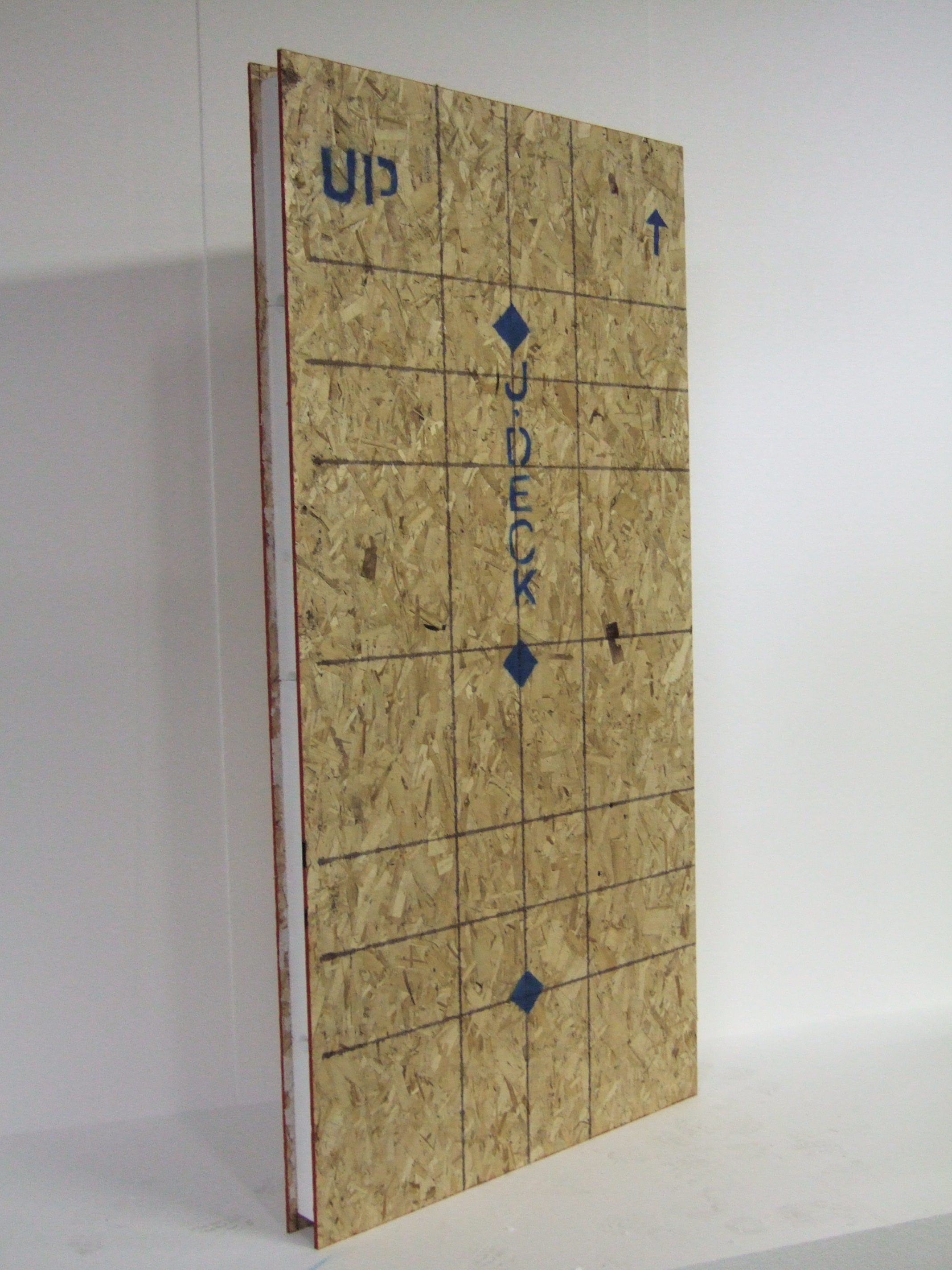
Standard OSB with EPS-core structural insulated panel

Although foam-core panels gained attention in the 1970s, the idea of using stress-skinned panels for construction began in the 1930s. Research and testing of the technology was done primarily by Forest Products Laboratory (FPL) in Madison, Wisconsin, as part of a U.S. Forest Service attempt to conserve forest resources. In 1937, a small stressed-skin house was constructed and garnered enough attention to bring in First Lady Eleanor Roosevelt to dedicate the house. In a testament to the durability of such panel structures, it endured the Wisconsin climate and was used by University of Wisconsin–Madison as a daycare center until the early 2000s, when it was removed to make way for a new Pharmacy School building. With the success of the stress-skinned panels, it was suggested stronger skins could take all the structural load and eliminate the frame altogether.

Thus in 1947, structural insulated panel development began when corrugated paperboard cores were tested with various skin materials of plywood, tempered hardboard and treated paperboard. The building was dismantled in 1978, and most of the panels retained their original strength with the exception of paperboard, which is unsuited to outdoor exposure. Panels consisting of polystyrene core and paper overlaid with plywood skins were used in a building in 1967, and as of 2005 the panels performed well.

SIP systems were used by Woods Constructors of Santa Paula, California, in their homes and apartments from 1965 until 1984. This work was the basis for John Thomas Woods, Paul Flather Woods, John David Woods, and Frederick Thomas Woods when they used a similar concept to patent the Footing Form for Modular homes (US Patent No. 4817353) issued on April 4, 1989. Numerous homes in Santa Paula, Fillmore, Palm Springs, and surrounding areas use SIPs as the primary method of construction. The design was awarded approval from (then) ICBO and SBCCI, now ICC.

== Materials ==
SIPs are most commonly made of oriented strand board (OSB) panels sandwiched around a foam core made of expanded polystyrene (EPS), extruded polystyrene (XPS) or rigid polyurethane foam. Other materials can be used in replacement of OSB, such as plywood, pressure-treated plywood for below-grade foundation walls, steel, aluminum, cement board such as Hardiebacker, and even exotic materials like stainless steel, fiber-reinforced plastic, and magnesium oxide wallboard. Some SIPs use fiber-cement or plywood sheets for the panels, and agricultural fiber, such as wheat straw, for the core.

The third component in SIPs is the spline or connector piece between SIPs. Dimensional lumber is commonly used but creates thermal bridging and lowers insulation values. To maintain higher insulation values through the spline, manufacturers use insulated lumber, composite splines, mechanical locks, overlapping OSB panels, or other creative methods. Depending on the method selected, other advantages such as full nailing surfaces or increased structural strength may become available.

== Methods of manufacturing ==
SIP's are most often manufactured in a traditional factory. Processing equipment is used to regulate pressures and heat in a uniform and consistent manner. There are two main processing methods which correspond to the materials used for the SIP core. When manufacturing a panel with a polystyrene core both pressure and heat are required to ensure the bonding glue has penetrated and set completely. Although a number of variations exist, in general, the foam core is first covered with an adhesive and the skin is set in place. The three pieces are set into a large clamping device and pressure and heat are applied. The three pieces must stay in the clamping device until the glue has cured.

When manufacturing a panel with a polyurethane core pressure and heat are both generated from the expansion of the foam during the foaming process. The skins are set in a large clamping device which functions as a mold. The skins must be held apart from each other to allow the liquid polyurethane materials to flow into the device. Once in the device, the foam begins to rise. The mold/press is generally configured to withstand the heat and the pressures generated from the chemical foaming. The SIP is left in the mold/press to cure slightly and when removed will continue to cure for several days.

Until recently, both of these processes required a factory setting. However, recent advancements have presented an alternative with SIP processing equipment that allows SIPs to be manufactured on the job-site. Builders in developing countries may benefit most, where the technology is unavailable but may be best suited to reduce greenhouse emissions and improve sustainability in housing.

== Benefits and drawbacks ==
The use of SIPs brings many benefits and some drawbacks compared to a conventional framed building.

The costs of SIPs are higher than the materials for a comparable framed building in the United States; however, this may not be true elsewhere. A well-built home using SIPs will have a tighter building envelope and the walls will have higher insulating properties, which leads to fewer drafts and a decrease in operating costs. Also, due to the standardized and all-in-one nature of SIPs, construction time can be less than for a frame home, as well as requiring fewer tradespeople. The panels can be used as floor, wall, and roof, with the use of the panels as floors being of particular benefit when used above an uninsulated space below. As a result, the total life-cycle cost of a SIP-constructed building will, in general, be lower than for a conventional framed one—by as much as 40%. Whether the total construction cost (materials and labor) is lower than for conventional framing appears to depend on the circumstances, including local labor conditions and the degree to which the building design is optimized for one or the other technology.

An OSB skinned system structurally outperforms conventional stick framed construction in some cases; primarily in axial load strength. SIPs maintain similar versatility to stick framed houses when incorporating custom designs. Also, since SIPs work as framing, insulation, and exterior sheathing, and can come precut from the factory for the specific job, the exterior building envelope can be built quite quickly. SIPs panels also tend to be lightweight and compact which aids this offsite construction. The environmental performance of SIPs, moreover, is very good due to their exceptional thermal insulation. They also offer a resistance to damp and cold problems like compression shrinkage and cold bridging that cannot be matched by timber and more traditional building materials.

When tested under laboratory conditions, the SIP, included in a wall, foundation, floor, or roof system, is installed in a steady-state (no air infiltration) environment; systems incorporating fiberglass insulation are not installed in steady-state environments as they require ventilation to remove moisture.

With the exception of structural metals, such as steel, all structural materials creep over time. In the case of SIPs, the creep potential of OSB faced SIPs with EPS or polyurethane foam cores has been studied and creep design recommendations exist. The long-term effects of using unconventional facing and core materials require material specific testing to quantify creep design values.

== Dimensions and characteristics ==
In the United States, SIPs tend to come in sizes from 4 to 24 feet (1.2–7.3 m) in width. Elsewhere, typical product dimensions are 300, 600, or 1,200 mm wide and 2.4, 2.7, and 3 m long, with roof SIPs up to 6 m long. Smaller sections ease transportation and handling, but the use of the largest panel possible will create the best insulated building. At 15−20 kg/m^{2}, longer panels can become difficult to handle without the use of a crane to position them, and this is a consideration that must be taken into account due to cost and site limitations. Also of note is that when needed for special circumstances longer spans can often be requested, such as for a long roof span. Typical U.S. height for panels is 8 or 9 feet (2.4 or 2.7 m). Panels come in widths ranging from 4 to 12 inches (100–300 mm) thick and a rough cost is $4–$6/ft^{2} in the U.S. In 4Q 2010, new methods of forming radius, sine curve, arches and tubular SIPs were commercialized. Due to the custom nature and technical difficulty of forming and curing specialty shapes, pricing is typically three or four times that of standard panels per foot.

EPS is the most common of the foams used and has an R-value (thermal resistance) of about 4 °F·ft^{2}·h/Btu (equivalent to about 0.7 K·m^{2}/W) per 25 mm thickness, which would give the 3.5 inches (89 mm) of foam in a 4.5-inch-thick (110 mm) panel an R value of 13.8 (caution: extrapolating R-values over thickness may be imprecise due to non-linear thermal properties of most materials). This at face value appears to be comparable to an R-13 batt of fiberglass, but because in a standard stick frame house there is significantly more wall containing low R value wood that acts as a cold bridge, the thermal performance of the R-13.8 SIP wall will be considerably better.

The air sealing features of SIP homes resulted in the US Environmental Protection Agency's Energy Star program to establish an inspection protocol in lieu of the typically required blower door test to assess the home's air leakage. This serves to speed the process and save the builder/homeowner money.

== Standardization and design ==
Construction of a prefabricated modular house (Click here for a time-lapse video)

The International Building Code references APA, Plywood Design Specification 4—Design & Fabrication of Plywood Sandwich Panels for the design of SIPs. This document addressed the basic engineering mechanics of SIPs but does not provide design properties for the panels provided by any specific manufacturer. In 2007, prescriptive design provisions for OSB faced SIPs were first introduced in the 2006 International Residential Code. These provisions provide guidance on the use of SIPs as walls panels only.

Aside from these non-proprietary standards, the SIP industry has relied heavily on proprietary code evaluation reports. In early 2009, SIPA partnered with ICC NTA, LLC, a third-party product evaluation certification agency, to produce the first industry wide code report which is available to all SIPA members who qualify. Unlike previous code reports, the prescriptive provisions provided in the SIPA code report are derived from an engineering design methodology which permits the design professional to consider loading conditions not addressed in the code report.
