= Truss uplift =

Architectural term

Truss uplift or truss lift is the shrinking of the wood in wooden trusses, causing the bottom-most piece to bow upwards, most notably near the middle. Truss lift is an issue in wood-frame construction where non-load bearing walls meet ceilings, as the truss lifting pulls the ceiling drywall up. This in turn pulls the angle tape out of the corner and can damage the spray texture. One solution is to not fasten the ceiling drywall within two feet of a non-load bearing wall, and rather use the drywall on the wall as support. This technique will allow the ceiling board to bow down and stay tight to the angle over time as the truss lifts.
