= Spackling paste =

Putty that fills small holes in walls and ceilings

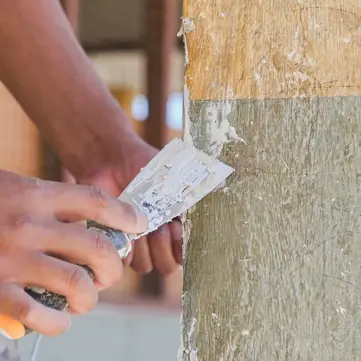
Spackle applied to a rough surface using a putty knife

Spackling paste or spackle is a putty used to fill holes, small cracks, and other minor surface defects in wood, drywall, and plaster. Typically, spackling is composed of gypsum plaster from hydrated calcium sulfate and glue.

== Spackle trademark ==
Spackle is an abandoned trademark of the Muralo Company, located in Bayonne, New Jersey. Muralo's product is dry powder, to be mixed with water by the user to form putty or paste brought to market in 1927, then patented and trademarked in 1928. The term spackle has since become a genericized trademark applied in the United States to a variety of household hole-filling products.

The first written appearance of the generic use of the word spackle was around 1940. The product name was likely derived from the German word Spachtel, meaning "putty knife" or "filler." Other possible origins include Russian шпаклевать (tr. shpaklevat; to fill holes with putty or caulk), Polish szpachla (spatula or putty knife), and Yiddish spaklieven (to fill in small holes in plaster), all of which are likely derived from German.

== Polyfilla ==
In the United Kingdom, Ireland, South Africa, Australia, and Canada, the brand "Polyfilla", multipurpose filler, is used as a generic term for spackling paste, even though it differs from spackle in being cellulose based. The manufacturers claim that it has an advantage over spackle in that it does not shrink or crack.

== Comparison with joint compound ==
Spackling paste is comparable to joint compound. Both serve the similar purpose of filling in low spots in walls and ceilings. Spackling paste typically dries faster, shrinks less during drying, and is meant for smaller repairs. Unlike joint compound, spackle cannot be used as a skim coat or to finish drywall. It is not uncommon to call any of these products "spackle", but tradespersons will usually specify joint compound (drywall mud) when that is specifically meant.

== See also ==
- Plastering
