= Knockdown =

Knockdown or knock-down may refer to:

- Knockdown, a situation in full-contact combat sports where a fighter is down or vulnerable, often preliminary to a knockout
- Knockdown, a nautical term for a near-capsize
- Knockdown (arcade game)', an arcade game released by Namco
- "Knockdown" (Castle), the thirteenth episode of the third season of the TV series Castle
- Knockdown (G.I. Joe), a fictional character in the G.I. Joe universe
- "Knockdown" (song), a song by Alesha Dixon
- Knockdown, Gloucestershire, a hamlet near Sherston, Wiltshire, United Kingdom
- Gene knockdown, a genetic modification technique
- knock-down fastener
- knock-down furniture
- Knock-down kit, a complete kit needed to assemble a vehicle
- Knockdown resistance, genetic resistance to pyrethroid insecticides in many insect species
- Knockdown texture, a drywall finishing style
- KnocDown, a music producer
