= Knockdown texture =

Drywall finishing style

Knockdown texture is a drywall finishing style. It is a mottled texture, it has more changes in textures than a simple flat finish, but less changes than orange peel, or popcorn, texture.

Heavy knockdown applied with a spray hopper.

Knockdown texture is created by watering down joint compound to a soupy consistency. A trowel is then used to apply the joint compound. The joint compound will begin to form stalactites as it dries. The trowel is then run over the surface of the drywall, knocking off the stalactites and leaving the mottled finish.

A much more common, and faster technique is to apply the texture mud (which is slightly different from joint compound, in that it has less shrinkage upon drying) with a texture machine – a compressor and a texture spray hopper which sprays mud instead of paint. This applies what is referred to as a splatter coat. The use of a compressor allows this to be applied to walls as well as ceilings. When knocking this down, the mud is allowed to dry for a short period, then skimmed with a knockdown knife – a large, usually plastic (to reduce noticeable edges) knife.

Knockdown texture reduces construction costs because it conceals imperfections in the drywall that normally require higher, more expensive stages of sanding and priming.
