= ThermaSAVE =

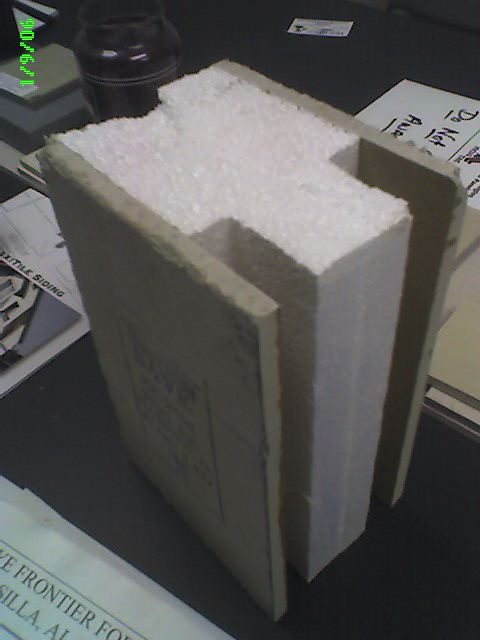
Corner view of ThermaSAVE panel segment abut

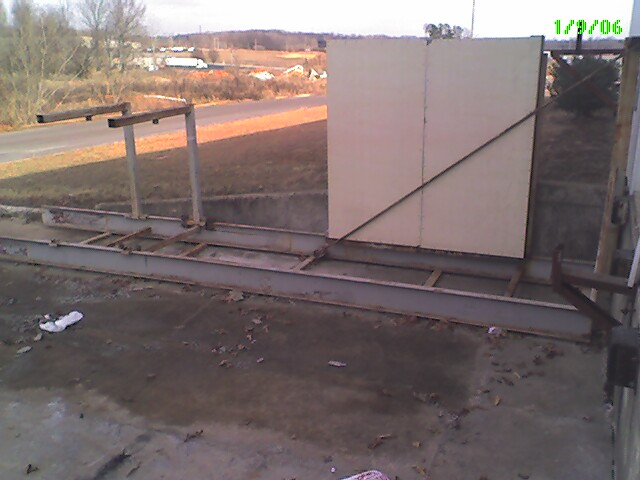
Completed ThermaSAVE panel awaits destructive testing.

ThermaSAVE is a panel building system which uses a 4 to 12-inch-thick core of expanded polystyrene sandwiched between two sheets of cellulose fiber-reinforced cement board varying in thickness from 3/8 to 7/16 inch, depending on structural requirements. This creates a "stress skinned" panel, also known as structural insulated panels (SIPs). Since c. 1984 H.H. "Hoot" Haddock from Florence, Alabama has been working on perfecting a polystyrene-based building system that would be faster and easier to construct than wood-framed buildings, while having superior insulation and strength.

== Demonstrations ==
Haddock has used the panels to construct an 18,000-square-foot (1,700 m^{2}) Ford showroom and a 32,000-square-foot (3,000 m^{2}) church, and at trade shows Haddock parks a 3,400-pound pickup truck on a 24-foot-long foam panel ramp which remains straight.

== Advantages ==
Because expanded polystyrene is 95% air it is an excellent insulator; and the hard cement skin, bonded to the polystyrene, provides the structural support. In combination the ThermaSAVE panels provide the best of both worlds and have numerous advantages over standard building materials.

- Better insulation with an R-value of 21.6 vs. 11 for wood results in significant cooling and heating savings.
- Weight load of a wall per linear foot is 3,750 vs. 3,200 for wood.
- Resistant to fire, wind, pests, moisture and sound. (Fire test video)
- Easy assembly requiring only a third of the time to set up the LEGO-like panels.
- Lower overall cost with a 1,456-square-foot (135.3 m^{2}) in Houston costing $55,287 with conventional materials and labor vs. $46,597 with a panel system.

== Disaster reconstruction ==
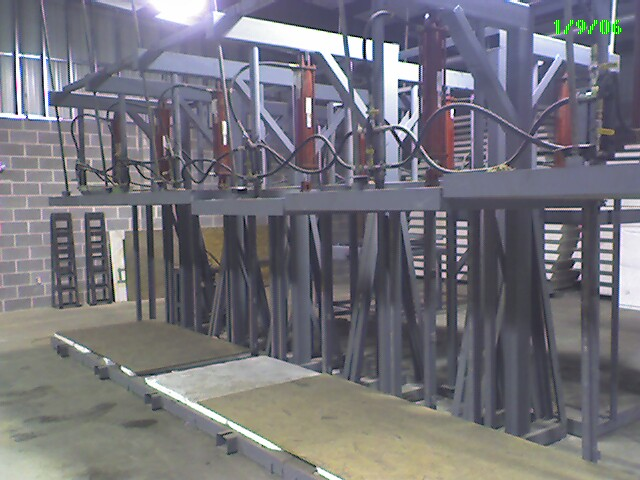
Hydraulic presses facilitate panels' adhesive cure.

After some consultation Haddock participated in an earthquake test conducted in Cincinnati on January 28, 2005, which was filmed by Daily Planet. The two-story building withstood accelerations beyond 7g without losing any screws, whereas the previous record was 4 g. The test continued until the testing machine began to fail, but the building remained intact.

With the success of the tests the ThermaSAVE Building System could be implemented in Iran, Afghanistan and even in areas affected by the 2004 Indian Ocean tsunami by 2006.
