= Joint compound =

Gypsum paste for filling seams in drywall

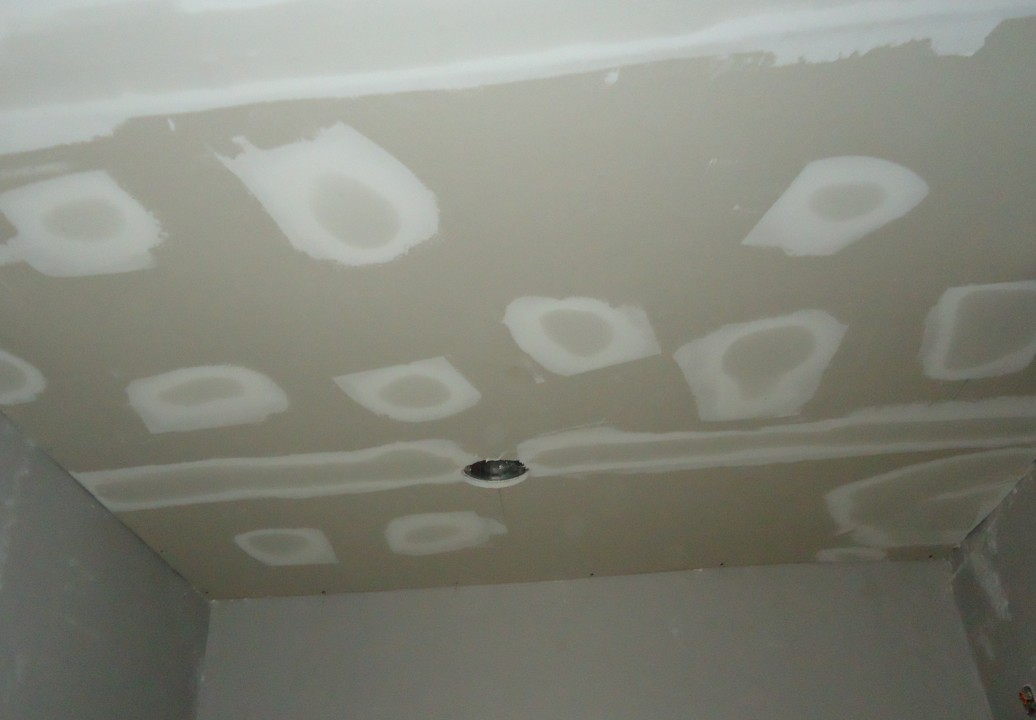
Kitchen renovation spackling to cover holes and tape between sheetrock boards

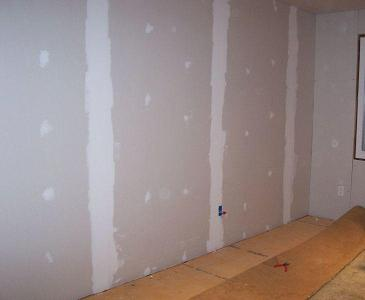
Drywall with joint compound applied.

Joint compound (also known as drywall compound, drywall mud, joint cement or mastic) is a white powder of primarily gypsum dust mixed with water to form a paste with the consistency of cake frosting, which is spread onto drywall and sanded when dry to create a seamless base for paint on walls and ceilings.

When used for new walls, joint compound effectively eliminates blemishes from the surface of drywall, such as fasteners, damage, or drywall tape. Joint compound is used to finish gypsum panel joints filled with paper or fiber joint tape, corner bead, trim and fasteners, and to skim coat. It is also convenient for patching holes, bumps, tears, and other minor damage to existing walls. In North America, troweling joint mud on gypsum panels is a standard construction technique prior to painting wall and ceiling surfaces.

Joint compound type and formula selection forms part of a drywall system that can be finished anywhere from a level 0 to a level 5, where 0 is not finished in any fashion, and 5 is the most pristine.

A similar compound is used in sprayed-on textural finishing for gypsum panel walls and ceilings that are pre-sealed and coated with a joint compound. Until the last century, several different plasters such as veneer plaster and "plaster of Paris" have been used in similar ways to joint compounds as fillers or for decorative purposes since ancient times, and the actual make up, and working properties of these compounds is much similar.

== Supply forms ==
=== Ready-mix/Premixed ===
Ready-mix joint compound is a pre-made joint compound of drying type only designed for fast application and easy maintenance. The compound is a complex combination often including water, limestone, expanded perlite, ethylene-vinyl acetate polymer, attapulgite, and other ingredients.

=== Powdered ===
Powdered joint compound is mixed with water immediately before use. Powdered drying or setting-type compounds are available in similar combinations and consistency as the ready-mix. This type of joint compound is commonly referred to as "hot mud" due to the exothermic reaction that takes place when the powder is mixed with water.

== Types ==
=== Drying ===
Drying-type comes in ready-mix or powdered form. Drying-type joint compounds are vinyl based and harden by evaporation. Drying-type joint compound is usually more forgiving than setting type joint compound and can be used for as long a period as needed while not dry or frozen. Drying-type compound and all materials should be used at temperatures above 13 °C (55 °F).

=== Setting ===
Setting type comes only in powdered form and are mixed with water immediately before use. Setting-type joint compounds are plaster of paris based and harden by chemical processes and evaporation rather than solely evaporation, giving it an advantage in filling holes and gaps that would take many days to dry out with shrinkage cracks if using the drying type compound. Another advantage to setting-type compounds is that after curing, they do not soften when wet. Thus, they are better for moist environments, such as bathrooms.

Setting type compounds are available in setting times ranging from 5 to 300 minutes and finish characteristics from tough and well bonded to soft and easy to sand. After setting any leftover cannot be resaturated and reused. All tools in contact with setting type joint compound must be very clean, or the compound may be set up prematurely. Setting type compounds can be used at temperatures down to 7 °C (45 °F).

== Special formulas ==
=== Lightweight ===
Lightweight joint compound formulas weigh 25-30% less than conventional joint compounds due to ingredient changes and allows for easier sanding.

=== Reduced dust ===
Reduced dust formulas cause the dust particles to clump together, falling out of the air sooner than regular formulas, thus reducing airborne dust.

=== Moisture and Mold ===
Moisture- and mold-resistant formulas are available.

=== Tapeless ===
Tapeless drywall joint compounds can be applied directly to the joints without either paper or fibreglass mesh tape. Eliminating the taping steps can save about 30% of labour time for finishing drywall joints.

Tapeless setting joint compounds are either reinforced by chemical glues or fibers.

Tapeless drying-type joint compounds can be mixed with a fiber additive which can be mixed into conventional drying-type compounds to create tapeless joint compounds.

=== Fire rated penetrations ===
Firewalls, walls built to slow the spread of fire, with penetrations fill the gap around the penetration with fire-safing material (fire wool) and the surface around the penetration is sealed with an additional 13-to-25-millimeter-thick (1/2 to 1 in) fire-rated, penetration joint compound that dries red in color making it easier for inspector to validate its presence. Drywall systems without penetrations can obtain ASTM C475 fire ratings using conventional joint compound at the seams.

== Usage ==
Mudding is usually done in three layers, with the sheets of drywall to be mudded usually having tapered edges to provide space for the thickness of the tape and mud at the seams. Correct type of mud selection is essential for the first and last layer, though an all-purpose compound may be adequate for all coats. Some drywall professionals use setting type mud for the first coat and a drying type for the thinner finish coat.

Three main joint compound layers/coats:

1. Bedding coat or taping coat where the mud is applied to seams and corners and paper joint tape is pressed into the mud (if using a fiberglass mesh tape the self-adhering tape is applied to the joints first, and the mud pressed through the tape). The mud used here needs to adhere well and be strong and is called a taping compound; typically met by all-purpose compound.
2. Filler coat where the tape is covered and roughly smoothed
3. Finish coat or topping coat which is very smooth. A topping compound is soft, smooth and easy to level and sand. Some finish coat sanding is usually required to get a smooth surface.

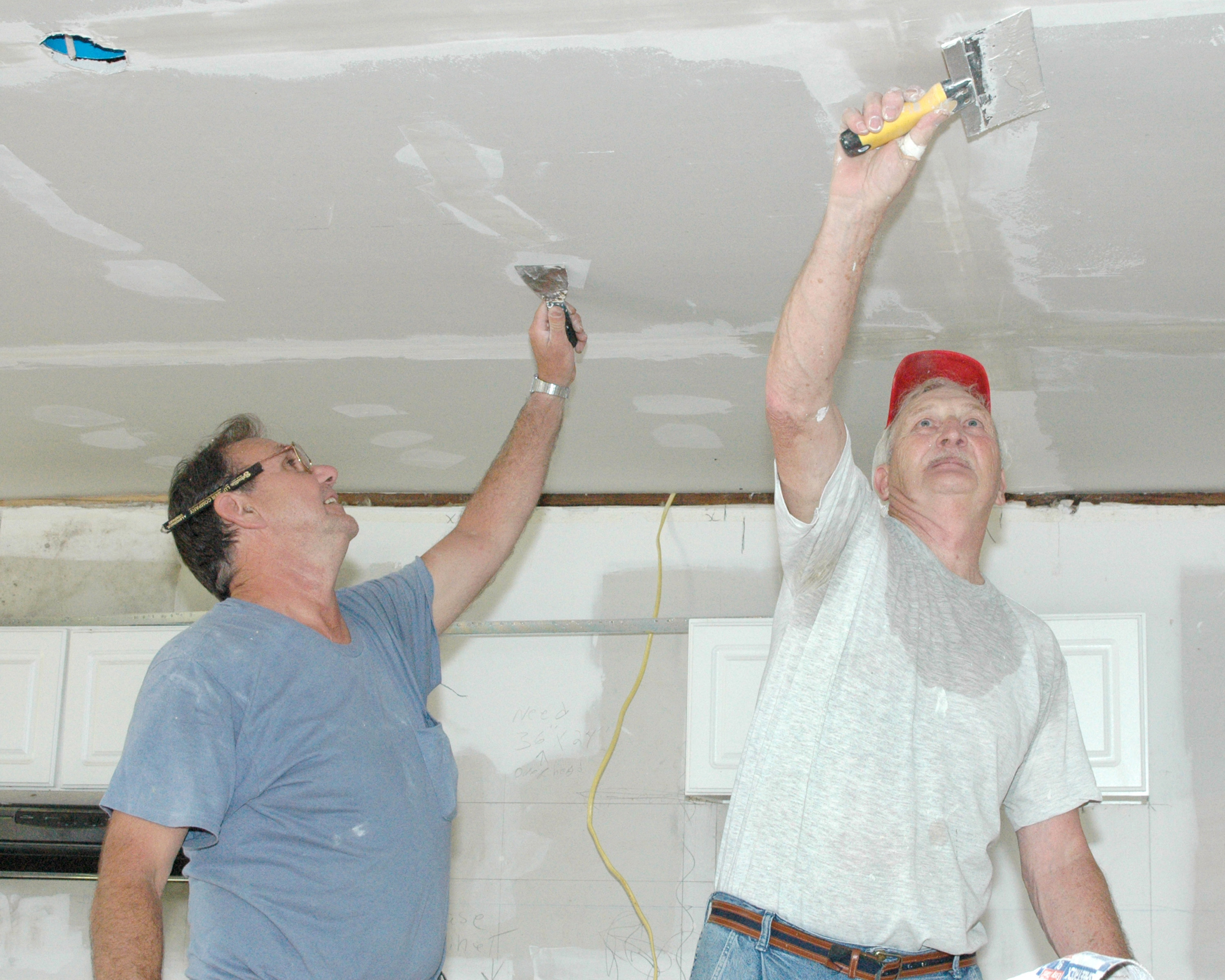
Workers applying joint compound to drywall.

Joint compound is the primary material used in the drywall industry applied by a tradesperson called a "drywaller," "taper," or "drywall taper." The flexibility and plastic qualities of joint compound make it a versatile material both as a sealer or finishing coat for wall surfaces and in decorative applications ranging from machine sprayed texturing to hand-trowelled or even hand-crafted sculptural finishes.

Applying and sanding joint compound is messy work, and finished surfaces, such as floors and air handling ducts, must be covered.

=== Pockmarks ===
Pockmarks are defects caused by air bubbles which form after the joint compound is applied, due to the inability of moisture to be absorbed into the surface under certain surface conditions:

- already painted
- layer of grease
- layer of cigarette smoke
- drying-type compound applied over a dense, setting-type compound.

The moisture exits through the finished surface, making bubbles that dry as pockmarks. The bubbles can be reworked while the compound is drying to attain a smooth surface. Although additives exist to reduce pockmarks, additive use is discouraged by drywall manufacturers as they reduce bonding, so they should not be used on the bed coat. Pockmarks may be created intentionally to mimic certain rough wallpaper textures.

== Comparison with spackling paste ==
Joint compound is comparable and contrastable with spackling paste. While the two terms are frequently used interchangeably, joint compound and spackle are not the same thing. Both serve the similar purpose of filling in low spots in walls and ceilings. Spackling paste typically dries faster, shrinks less during drying, and is meant for smaller repairs. Unlike spackle, joint compound can be used as a skim coat and has other uses.

== Health concerns ==
Construction workers mixing or sanding drywall joint compound are often exposed to high concentrations of dusts containing talc, calcite, mica, gypsum, and in some cases, respirable silica; which have been associated with varying degrees of immediate eye, nose, throat, and respiratory tract irritation. Prolonged exposure over time to breathing the dust from drywall joint compounds may cause persistent throat and airway irritation, coughing, phlegm production, and breathing difficulties similar to asthma. When silica is present in the drywall joint compound, workers may also face an increased risk of silicosis and lung cancer.

Prior to 1977, joint compounds often contained asbestos fibers to enhance cohesiveness. Exposure to friable asbestos increases the risks of various severe health conditions, including cancer. In 1977 the U.S. Consumer Product Safety Commission banned wall patching (joint) compounds containing asbestos.

For the reasons above and possibly others, constant use of a respirator is recommended by almost all drywall compound manufacturers and is required by some labor authorities.

== See also ==
- Spackling paste – Putty that fills small holes in walls and ceilings
- Plaster-of-paris
- Plasterwork – Construction or ornamentation done in plaster or a similar material
- Calcium silicate – Chemical compound naturally occurring as the mineral larnite
