= Magnesium oxide wallboard =

Building material

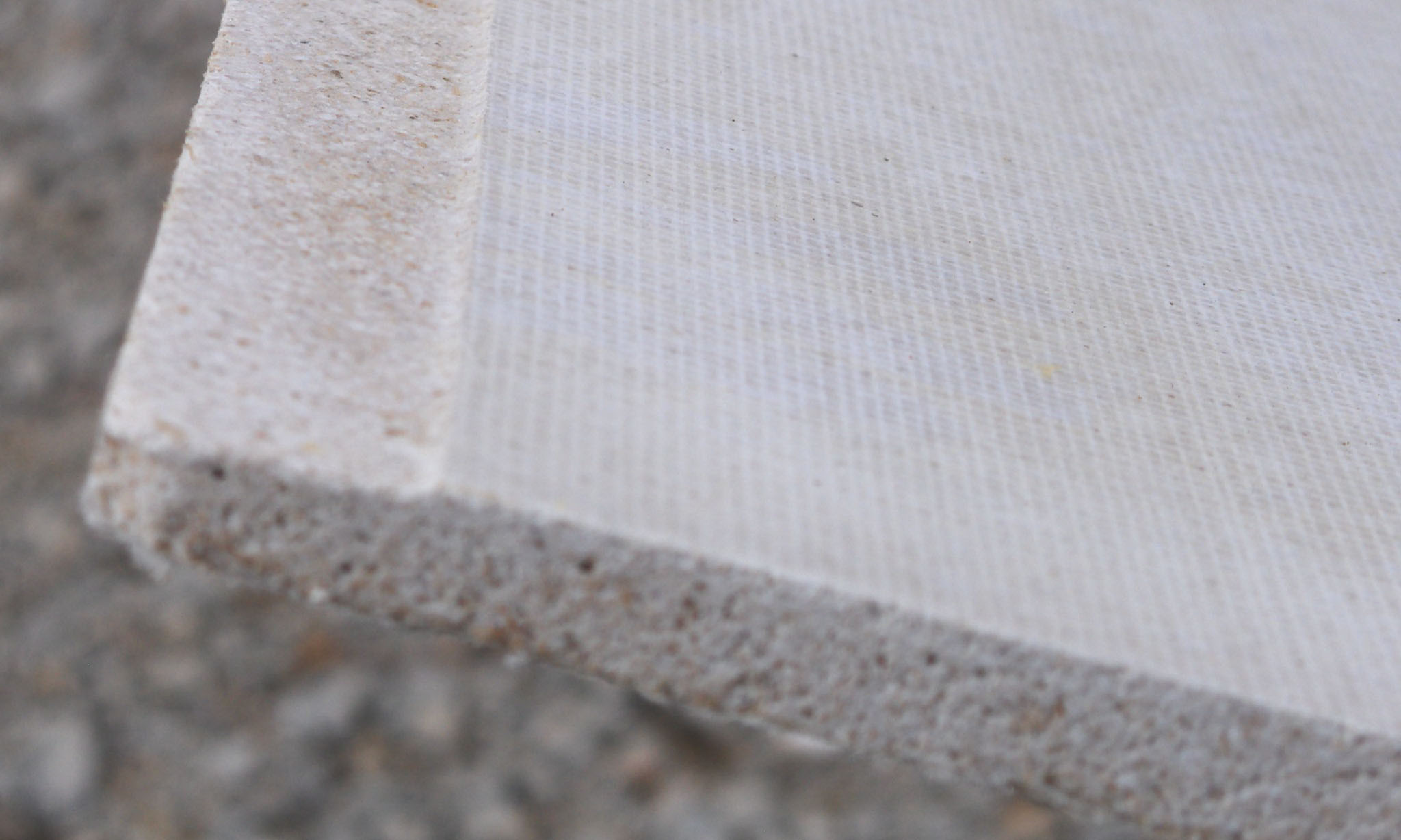
Magnesium oxide wallboard (10 mm thickness)

Magnesium oxide, more commonly called magnesia, is a mineral that when used as part of a cement mixture and cast into thin cement panels under proper curing procedures and practices can be used in residential and commercial building construction. Some versions are suitable for general building uses and for applications that require fire resistance, mold and mildew control, as well as sound-control applications. Magnesia board has strength and resistance due to very strong bonds between magnesium and oxygen atoms that form magnesium oxide crystals (with the chemical formula MgO).

Magnesia boards are used in place of traditional gypsum drywall as wall and ceiling covering material and sheathing. It is also used in other construction applications such as fascias, soffit, shaft-liner and area separation, wall sheathing, and as tile backing (backer board) or as substrates for coatings and insulated systems such as finish systems, exterior insulation finishing systems, and some types of stucco.

Magnesia cement board for building construction is available is various sizes and thickness. It is not a paper-faced material. It generally comes in light gray, white or beige. Grades include smooth face, rough texture, utility and versatile, and there are different densities and strengths for different applications and uses.

Various magnesia cement boards are used in Asia as a primary construction material. Some versions have been designated as the official construction-specified material of the 2008 Summer Olympics, and some versions are used extensively on the inside and outside of all the walls, fireproofing beams, and as the sub-floor sheathing in one of the world's tallest buildings, Taipei 101, in Taipei, Taiwan.

Magnesia cement is manufactured around the world, primarily near areas where magnesia-based ore (periclase) is mined. Major deposits are found in China, Europe, and Canada. Magnesia ore deposits in the US are negligible. Estimates put the use of magnesia board products at around 740,000 square metres (8 million square feet) in Asia. It is gaining popularity in the US, particularly near coastal regions.

== History ==
- Magnesia cement use in masonry construction is ancient. It was used primarily as a mortar component and stabilizer for soil bricks. Magnesia has also been identified in the Great Wall of China and other ancient landmarks. Roman cement is reported to have contained high levels of magnesia.
- In the West, Portland cement replaced magnesia for masonry uses in the 20th century when energy was cheap (see energy efficiency) and mold infection was poorly understood.
- However, some projects continued to use magnesia. New York City's Brooklyn Bridge base is made from locally mined cement, a mixture of calcium oxide and magnesia cement commonly called Rosendale cement, the only natural non-fired cement made in the US.
- Magnesia cement boards were approved for construction use in the US around 2003.
- Due to its fire resistance and safety ratings, New York and New Jersey were early adopters of magnesia cement board. Florida has adopted magnesia boards for mold/mildew resistance. It is hurricane and impact tested and approved in Miami-Dade County.
- Located in Taipei, Taiwan, magnesia board can be found on all 101 stories of Taipei 101, currently the eighth tallest building in the world. Magnesia sheeting was used on the inside and outside of all the walls, fireproofing beams and as the sub-floor sheathing.

== Purpose and use ==
Magnesia is widely used primarily as wallboard alternative to conventional gypsum-based drywall and plywoods. The magnesia boards can be scored and snapped, sawed, drilled, and fastened to wood or steel framing.

Magnesia boards are a good example of the advances made in construction materials to meet changes in building codes for safety and durability.

== Applications ==
- Interior wall and ceiling board
- Exterior wall and fencing board
- Exterior sheathing
- Trim materials
- Fascias
- Soffits
- Shaft-liner and area separation wall board
- Tile backing (backer board) and underlayment
- Substrates for coatings and insulated systems such as direct-applied finish systems, EIFS, SIPS, Portland type stucco and synthetic stuccos.

== Advantages ==
- Ratings and testing:
  - Fire-resistant (UL 055 and ASTM-tested and A-rated)
  - Water-resistant (freeze/thaw-tested for 36 months)
  - Mold/fungus/bug free (non-nutritious to mold, fungus, insects ASTM G-21)
  - Impact-resistant (ASTM D-5628)
  - NYC approved (MEA # 359-02-M)
  - Silica/asbestos free
  - STC-rated 53-54
- Can be used in the place of traditional drywall or cement boards. No special tools required.
- Hard non-absorbent surface – using fibreglass backing – with no paper.
- Can be used in applications like cement-based siding subject to using water-proof coating systems.
- Available in colors.
- Energy efficient – magnesite calcines at approx 780 Celsius, compared to over 1,400 Celsius required to form traditional Portland cement or calcium oxide, the starting material for the preparation of slaked lime or portlandite used in common mortar and plaster.
- Magnesia boards have been mentioned in articles about biologically friendly construction and risks of mold infection.
- Comparable in cost to cement board made from Portland cement, with numerous advantages over that material for wet applications.

== Disadvantages ==
- Natural deposits of magnesium carbonate (Magnesite ore) occur in China and this is calcined to produce magnesium oxide. Local governments in China prohibit the export of raw materials needed to manufacture MgO elsewhere.
- Little mining of magnesium based minerals occurs in the United States or Europe, and is not thought profitable other than for higher value ceramic applications such as refractory brick preparations (so called magnesia refractories). Most building projects involving low cost MgO board will inevitably rely on Chinese or Indian materials.
- In most cases, good quality magnesia board is more expensive than paperfaced gypsum drywall material.
- Like all cement mixtures, magnesia cements and related mixing recipes and equipment require strict controls in both the raw material going into the mixer, as well as the curing process and proper waiting time for setting and handling of the fresh and semi-fresh product. Many cheaper brands achieve high early strength using magnesium oxychloride cement technologies, which make the board more susceptible to water weakening and inconsistent material.
- Several different producers exist, with big differences in their production and selling costs, which greatly impacts on the mix design and curing process. This makes each brand very different in potential uses. Even though the different brands may look and feel similar, caution must be used when selecting the versions and brands for specific use since they are not all the same or usable in the same way. [?reference]
- Boards tend to have quite unique installation requirements. Each version of magnesia board needs to be installed using the manufacturer's recommendations to avoid installation problems.
- Most often the boards are produced by using Sorel cement (Magnesium oxychloride), resulting in a slightly hygroscopic product that can produce a problem called "crying boards" when applied in too humid climate. Example: Dokk1.
- The chloride in Sorel cement is relatively immobile, but in some cases can produce a corrosive environment for embedded fasteners and steel studs.

== See also ==
- Clay panel
