= Kevin Seefried =

American January 6 Capitol rioter

- Born: 1969 or 1970
- Occupation: Drywall mechanic
- Known for: Participation in the January 6 United States Capitol attack
- Convictions: Five charges including: obstructing an official proceeding, disorderly conduct in a Capitol building and entering and remaining in a restricted area
- Penalty: 3 years imprisonment

Kevin Seefried (born 1969 or 1970) is an American drywall mechanic and convicted felon known for his participation in the January 6 United States Capitol attack, during which he carried a Confederate battle flag inside the Capitol, marking the first time in U.S. history in which such a flag was displayed inside the Capitol. Seefried also threatened Eugene Goodman, an African-American United States Capitol Police officer. Images of Seefried carrying the flag inside the Capitol became some of the most recognizable images of the attack.

In 2023, Seefried was sentenced to three years in prison for his role in the attack. He was released from prison on May 31, 2024, having served more than one year of his sentence.

On January 20, 2025, the first day of the second presidency of Donald Trump, Seefried was pardoned along with nearly every other participant in the Capitol attack.

== Career and personal life ==
Seefried is a drywall mechanic from Delaware.

== January 6 U.S. Capitol attack ==
During the Capitol attack, Seefried was one of the first few attackers to enter the Capitol building, and he remained inside for 25 minutes, according to prosecutors. He brandished a Confederate flag on a flag pole and made threatening motions towards Black police officer Eugene Goodman. Images of Seefried became some of the most recognizable images of the attack. It was the first time in U.S. history in which a Confederate battle flag was displayed inside the Capitol.

Seefried was charged with obstructing an official proceeding, disorderly conduct in a Capitol building, and entering and remaining in a restricted area. Seefried's adult son Hunter also participated in the attack and was sentenced in October 2022 to two years in prison after being found guilty of obstruction.

Numerous Facebook posts claimed without evidence that Seefried was a registered Democrat and a supporter of Joe Biden.

In June 2022, the District Court for the District of Columbia judge Trevor McFadden found Seefried guilty on all five charges. On February 9, 2023, Seefried was sentenced to three years in prison. During his sentencing, his attorney A.J. Kramer stated that he wears a colostomy bag after previously recovering from rectal cancer.

On May 31, 2024, Seefried was released after serving more than a year in prison.

On January 20, 2025, the first day of the second presidency of Donald Trump, Seefried received a federal pardon along with nearly every other participant in the Capitol attack as part of Trump's pardon of January 6 United States Capitol attack defendants.

== See also ==
- List of cases of the January 6 United States Capitol attack (M-S)
- Criminal proceedings in the January 6 United States Capitol attack
- List of people granted executive clemency in the second Trump presidency
