= Cement board =

Backing board used in building construction

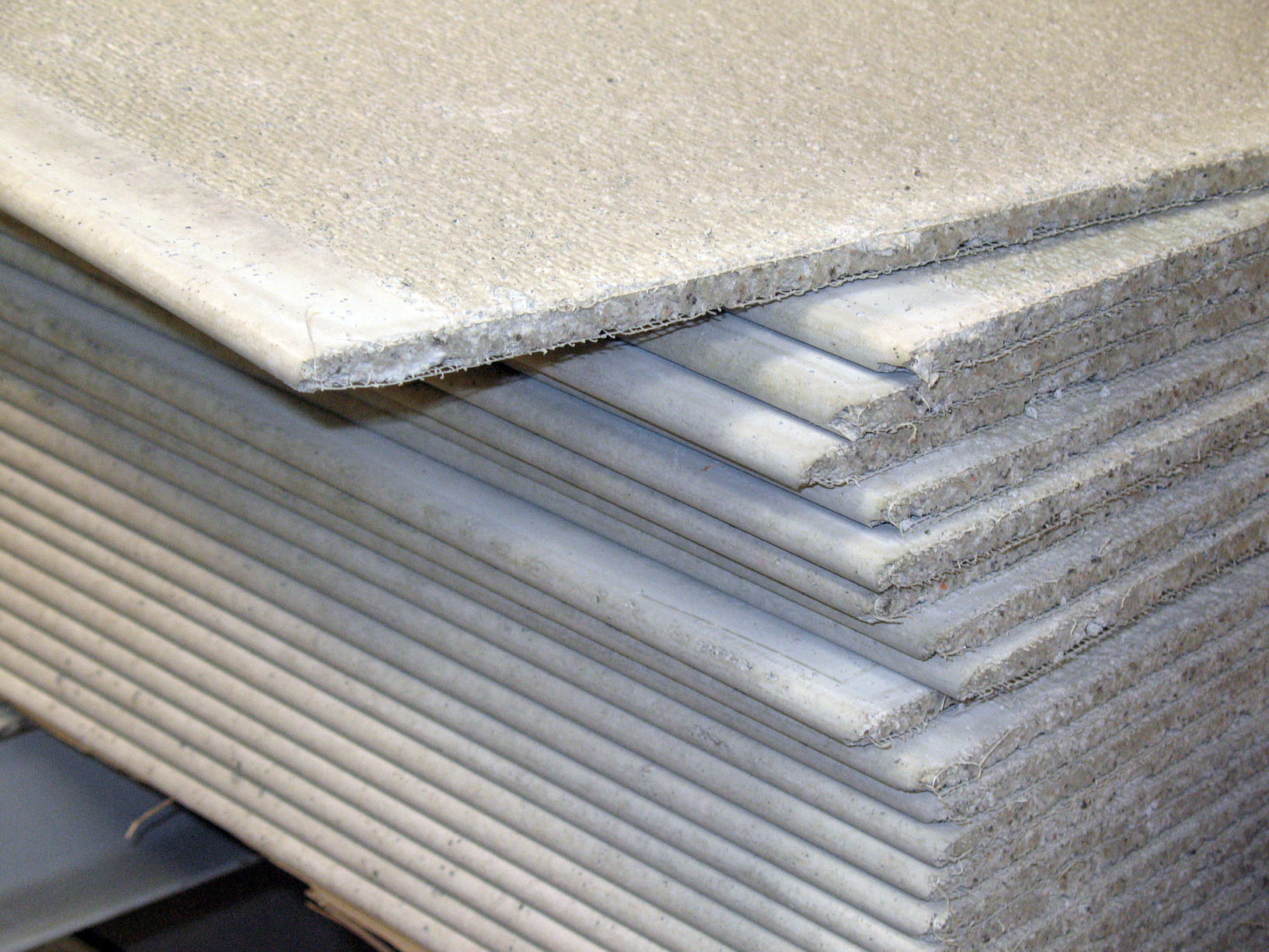
Cement board is composed of aggregated Portland cement with a glass-fiber mesh on the surfaces. This 5/16 inch (7.9 mm) thick cement board is designed as an underlayment for tile floors. These are 3-by-5-foot (91 by 152 cm) sheets.

A cement board is a combination of cement and reinforcing fibers formed into sheets, of varying thickness that are typically used as a tile backing board. Cement board can be nailed or screwed to wood or steel studs to create a substrate for vertical tile and attached horizontally to plywood for tile floors, kitchen counters and backsplashes. It can be used on the exterior of buildings as a base for exterior plaster (stucco) systems and sometimes as the finish system itself.

Cement board adds impact resistance and strength to the wall surface as compared to water resistant gypsum boards. Cement board is also fabricated in thin sheets with polymer modified cements to allow bending for curved surfaces.

== Composition ==
Cement boards are mainly cement bonded particle boards and Fibre cement.

Cement bonded particle boards have treated wood flakes as reinforcement, whereas cement fibre boards have cellulose fibre, which is a plant extract as reinforcement. Cement acts as binder in both the cases. The fire resistance properties of cement bonded blue particle boards and cement fibre boards are the same. In terms of load-bearing capacity, cement-bonded particle boards have higher capacity than cement fibre boards. Cement particle boards are manufactured from 1/4 to 1 9/16 inches (6 to 40 mm) thickness making it suitable for high load bearing applications.

These boards are made of a homogeneous mixture and hence are formed as single layer for any thickness. Cement fibre boards are more used in decorative applications and can be manufactured from 1/8 to 13/16 inch (3 to 20 mm) thickness. Fibre boards are made in very thin layers, making it extremely difficult to manufacture high thickness boards. Many manufacturers use additives like mica, aluminium stearate and cenospheres in order to achieve certain board qualities. Typical cement fiber board is made of approximately 40-60% of cement, 20-30% of fillers, 8-10% of cellulose, 10-15% of mica. Other additives like above mentioned aluminium stearate and PVA are normally used in quantities less than 1%. Cenospheres are used only in low density boards with quantities between 10 and 15%. The actual recipe depends on available raw materials and other local factors.

== Advantages ==
As a tile backing board, cement board has better long-term performance than paper-faced gypsum core products because it will not mildew or physically break down in the continued presence of moisture or leaks. Also cement board provides a stronger bond and support with tiles than typical gypsum board. Cement board is not waterproof. It absorbs moisture as well, but it has excellent drying properties. In areas continually exposed to water spray (i.e., showers) a waterproofing material is usually recommended behind the boards (i.e., plastic barrier) or as a trowel-applied product to the face of the boards behind the finish system (i.e., liquid membrane).

== Disadvantages ==
One major disadvantage of cement board is the weight per square foot. It is approximately twice that of gypsum board, making handling by one person difficult. Cutting of cement board must also be done with carbide-tipped tools and saw blades. Due to its hardness, pre-drilling of fasteners is often recommended. Finally, cement board is initially more expensive than water resistant gypsum board but may provide better long term value.

== Installation ==
Cement board is hung with corrosion resistant screws or ring-shank nails. Cement board has very little movement under thermal stress, but the boards are usually installed with a slight gap at joints in shower pans, bathtubs, and each other. These joints are then filled with silicone sealant or the manufacturer's taping compounds before applying a finish. The filled joints are taped like conventional gypsum board, but with fiberglass tapes that provide additional water resistance. Combined with a water impermeable finish, cement board is a stable, durable backing board.

== Water resistance ==
There is a class of cement board strictly constructed of a Portland cement based core with glass fiber mat reinforcing at both faces. These panels can be immersed in water without any degradation (excluding freeze thaw cycles). These panels do not require the sealing of edges and penetrations to maintain their structural integrity. These Portland cement based products are smaller in size compared with the gypsum core based products. Typically they range in size from 30 by 48 inches (76 cm × 122 cm) to 36 by 60 inches (91 cm × 152 cm). They are, as one would expect, considerably heavier than the gypsum core type panels.

Portland cement based panels are ideal for truly wet locations like shower surrounds and for locations where a Portland cement based thin-set material is used for bonding tile and stone surfaces to a substrate. They are also ideal for floor tile and stone installations over a structural subfloor.

Cement boards may be classified as water resistant as they are not affected by water exposure; however, they do allow penetration and passage of water and water vapor. To waterproof cement boards, a liquid or membrane waterproofing material is applied over its surface.

Cement boards should not be confused with gypsum core backer boards. Gypsum core backer boards are affected by water and should not be used on wet exposure areas.

== See also ==
- Clay panel
- Drywall
- Fiber cement siding
- Fibre cement
- Thermasave, an insulated structural panel
