= Clay panel =

Building material made of clay with some additives

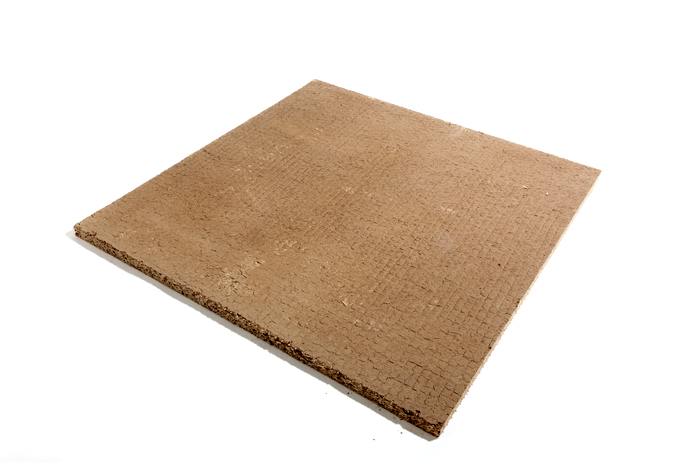
Clay panel or clay board

Clay panel or clay board (also known as loam panel, clay wallboard, clay building board, or clay building panel) is a panel made of clay with some additives. The clay is mixed with sand, water, and fiber, typically wood fiber, and sometimes other additives like starch. Most often this means employing the use of high-cellulose waste fibres. To improve the breaking resistance clay boards are often embedded in a hessian skin on the backside or similar embeddings.

By introducing the clay panels, the building material loam can also be used in dry construction. Clay wallboards are a sustainable alternative to gypsum plasterboards, suitable for drywall applications for interior walls and ceilings. It can be applied to either timber or metal studwork. Usually the application of clay boards is completed with clay finishing plaster.

== Constructional properties ==
The boards have fire retardant properties and medium levels of acoustic insulation. Due to the clay component they have the ability to absorb large amounts of humidity through the plaster and helping to protect vulnerable buildings from excess moisture generated by modern living.

== Production ==
Clay panels are available from different manufacturers in different designs. The main component is clay or loam. This is either reinforced by a reed mat or stabilised by straw or wood fibres (sawdust) as with clay bricks. Further vegetable or mineral aggregates may also be contained. The boards are not heat-treated, so that the positive characteristics of the clay remain in its entirety.

== Processing ==
Clay panels are used for the dry construction of wall and ceiling claddings and facing shells. The boards are mounted on a steel profile or wooden frame construction by means of screws or nails. For ceiling claddings, washers must be used depending on the type of clay panel. The panels can be sawn with standard tools, like a cutter knife, a jigsaw or a circular saw. The joints of the clay boards often have tongue and groove for easier processing. The joints must be reinforced with a jute fabric or glass fibre fabric and filled with a fine clay plaster mortar. The clay board is mounted in vertical or horizontal form. The clay building wall or ceiling can then be treated with a clay plaster or painted directly with clay paint.

== Combination with heating and cooling ==
Clay is an ideal construction material for combinations with heating and cooling. Before the development of drywall panels made of clay, however, wall heating elements could only be laid in clay plaster. Meanwhile, some manufacturers offer clay building boards with integrated heating and cooling pipes. This makes the installation of heating and cooling in dry construction on walls and ceilings much easier.

== Applications ==
- Interior wall and ceiling board
- Area separation wall board
- Backer board and underlayment
- Substrates for coatings and insulated systems
- Clay Climate Systems

== See also ==
- Enviroboard
- Magnesium oxide wallboard
