= Drywall =

Panel made of gypsum, used in interior construction

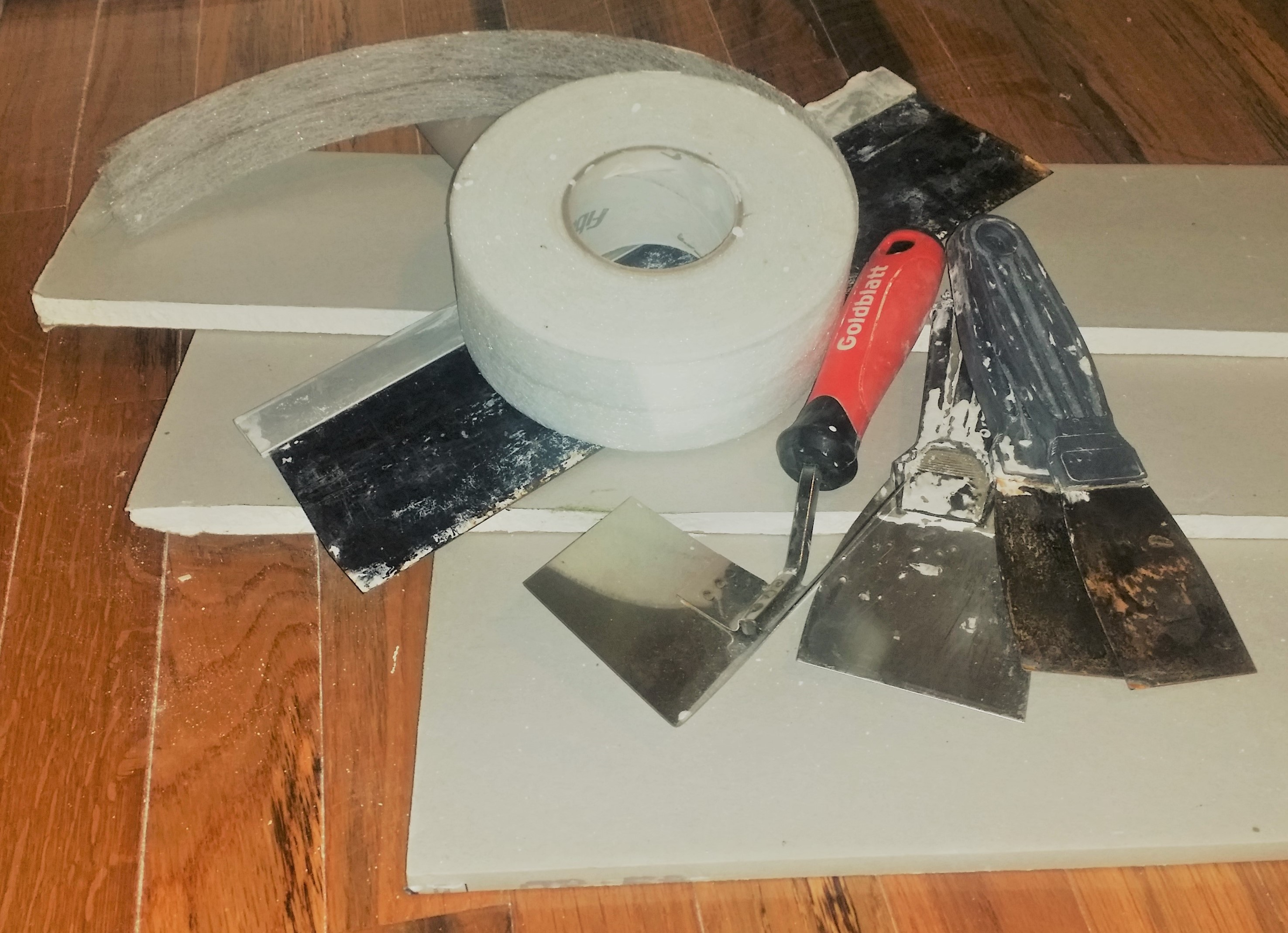
Various sized cuts of 1/2 in (13 mm) drywall with tools for maintenance and installation

Drywall (also called plasterboard, dry lining, wallboard, sheet rock, gib board, gypsum board, buster board, turtles board, slap board, custard board, gypsum panel and gyprock) is a panel made of calcium sulfate dihydrate (gypsum), with or without additives, typically extruded between thick sheets of facer and backer paper, used in the construction of interior walls and ceilings. The plaster is mixed with fiber (typically paper, glass wool, or a combination of these materials); plasticizer, foaming agent; and additives that can reduce mildew, flammability, and water absorption.

In the mid-20th century, drywall construction became prevalent in North America as a time- and labor-saving alternative to lath and plaster.

== History ==
Sackett Board was invented in 1890 by New York Coal Tar Chemical Company employees Augustine Sackett and Fred L. Kane, graduates of Rensselaer Polytechnic Institute. It was made by layering plaster within four plies of wool felt paper. Sheets were 36 by 36 by 1/4 inch (914 mm × 914 mm × 6 mm) thick with open (untaped) edges.

Gypsum board evolved between 1910 and 1930, beginning with wrapped board edges and the elimination of the two inner layers of felt paper in favor of paper-based facings. In 1910 United States Gypsum Corporation bought Sackett Plaster Board Company and by 1917 introduced Sheetrock. Providing installation efficiency, it was developed additionally as a measure of fire resistance. Later air entrainment technology made boards lighter and less brittle, and joint treatment materials and systems also evolved. Gypsum lath was an early substrate for plaster. An alternative to traditional wood or metal lath was a panel made up of compressed gypsum plaster board that was sometimes grooved or punched with holes to allow wet plaster to key into its surface. As it evolved, it was faced with paper impregnated with gypsum crystals that bonded with the applied facing layer of plaster. In 1936, US Gypsum trademarked ROCKLATH for their gypsum lath product.

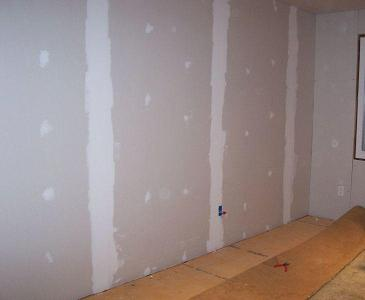
Vertically hung drywall with joint compound

In 2002, the European Commission imposed fines totaling €420 million on the companies Lafarge, BPB, Knauf and Gyproc Benelux, which had operated a cartel on the market which affected 80% of consumers in France, the UK, Germany and the Benelux countries.

== Manufacture ==
A wallboard panel consists of a layer of gypsum plaster sandwiched between two layers of paper. The raw gypsum, CaSO_{4}·2H_{2}O, is heated to drive off the water and then slightly rehydrated to produce the hemihydrate of calcium sulfate (CaSO_{4}·1/2H_{2}O). The plaster is mixed with fiber (typically paper and/or glass fiber), plasticizer, foaming agent, finely ground gypsum crystal as an accelerator, EDTA, starch or other chelate as a retarder, and various additives that may increase mildew and fire resistance, lower water absorption (wax emulsion or silanes), reduce creep (tartaric or boric acid). The board is then formed by sandwiching a core of the wet mixture between two sheets of heavy paper or fiberglass mats. When the core sets, it is dried in a large drying chamber, and the sandwich becomes rigid and strong enough for use as a building material.

Drying chambers typically use natural gas today. To dry 1,000 square feet (93 m^{2}) of wallboard, between 1,750,000 and 2,490,000 BTU (1.85–2.63 GJ) is required. Organic dispersants and plasticizers are used so that the slurry will flow during manufacture and to reduce the water and hence the drying time. Coal-fired power stations include devices called scrubbers to remove sulfur from their exhaust emissions. The sulfur is absorbed by powdered limestone in a process called flue-gas desulfurization (FGD), which produces several new substances. One is called "FGD gypsum". This is commonly used in drywall construction in the United States and elsewhere.

In 2020, 8.4 billion square meters of drywall were sold around the world.

== Construction techniques ==
As an alternative to a week-long plaster application, an entire house can be drywalled in one or two days by two experienced drywallers, and drywall is easy enough to be installed by many amateur home carpenters. In large-scale commercial construction, the work of installing and finishing drywall is often split between hangers, who install the wallboard, and tapers (also known as finishers, mud men, or float crew) who finish the joints and cover the fastener heads with drywall compound. Drywall can be finished anywhere from a level 0 to a level 5, where 0 is not finished in any fashion, and five is the most pristine. Depending on how significant the finish is to the customer, the extra steps in the finish may or may not be necessary, though priming and painting of drywall are recommended in any location where it may be exposed to any wear.

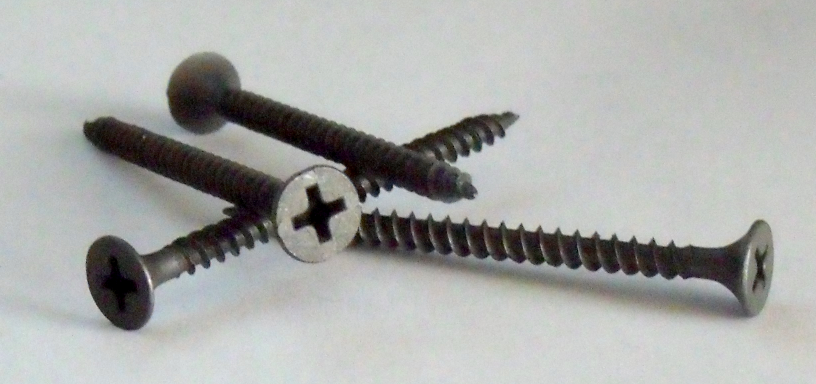
Drywall screws for wood, with parallel-threaded woodscrew shanks and bugle heads

Drywall is cut to size by scoring the paper on the finished side (usually white) with a utility knife, breaking the sheet along the cut, and cutting the paper backing. Small features such as holes for outlets and light switches are usually cut using a keyhole saw, oscillating multi-tool or a tiny high-speed bit in a rotary tool. Drywall is then fixed to the structure with nails or drywall screws and often glue. Drywall fasteners, also referred to as drywall clips or stops, are gaining popularity in residential and commercial construction. Drywall fasteners are used for supporting interior drywall corners and replacing the non-structural wood or metal blocking that traditionally was used to install drywall. Their function saves material and labor costs, minimizes call-backs due to truss uplift, increases energy efficiency, and makes plumbing and electrical installation simpler.

When driven fully home, drywall screws countersink their heads slightly into the drywall. They use a 'bugle head', a concave taper, rather than the conventional conical countersunk head; this compresses the drywall surface rather than cutting into it and so avoids tearing the paper. Screws for light-gauge steel framing have a sharp point and finely spaced threads. If the steel framing is heavier than 20-gauge, self-drilling screws with finely spaced threads must be used. In some applications, the drywall may be attached to the wall with adhesives.

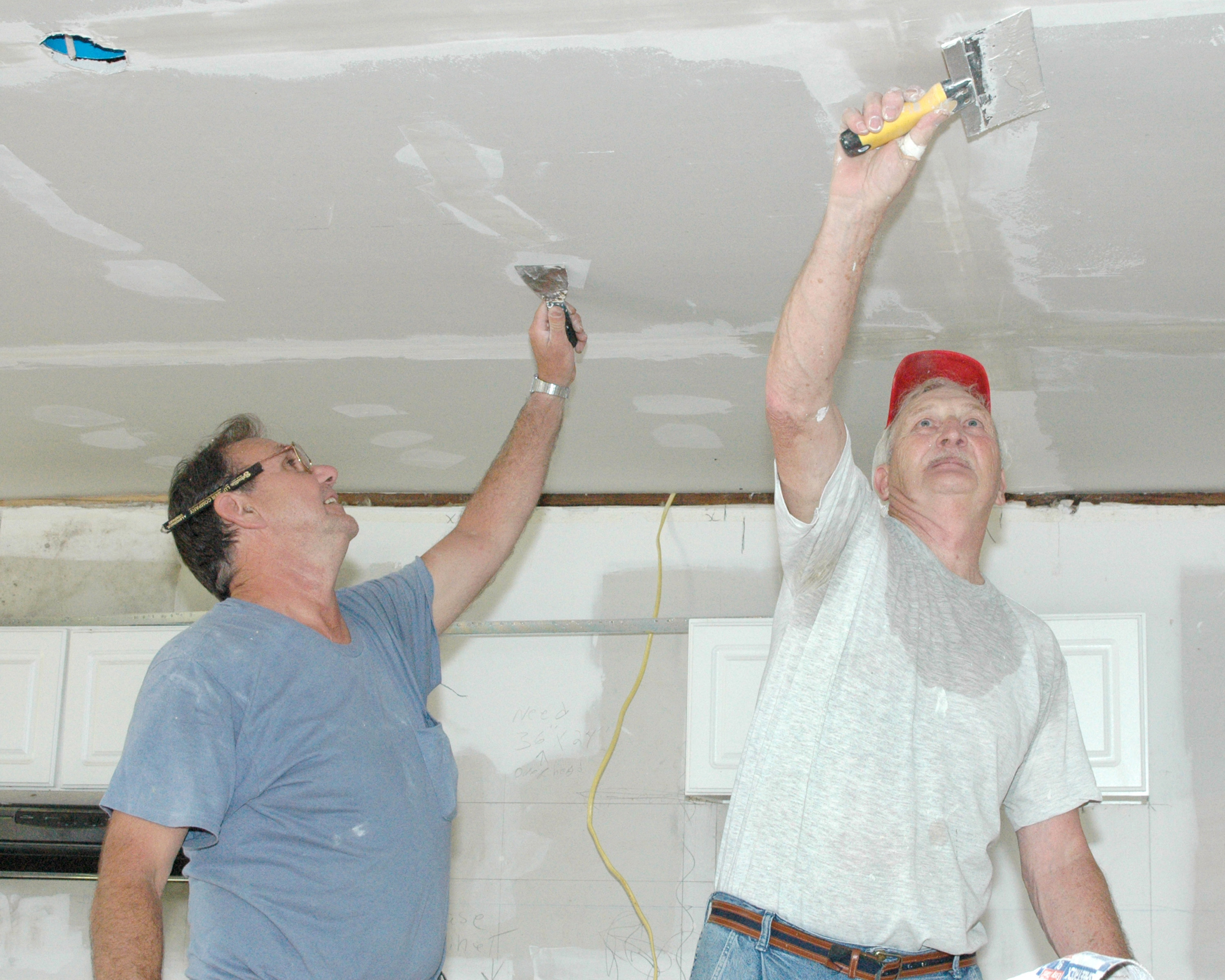
Applying "joint compound" to drywall

After the sheets are secured to the wall studs or ceiling joists, the installer conceals the seams between drywall sheets with joint tape or fiber mesh. Layers of joint compound, sometimes called mud, are typically spread with a drywall trowel or knife. This compound is also applied to any screw holes or defects. The compound is allowed to air dry and then typically sanded smooth before painting. Alternatively, for a better finish, the entire wall may be given a skim coat, a thin layer (about 1 mm or 1/32 in) of finishing compound, to minimize the visual differences between the paper and mudded areas after painting.

Another similar skim coating process is called veneer plastering, although it is done slightly thicker (about 2 mm or 3/32 in). Veneering uses a slightly different specialized setting compound ("finish plaster") that contains gypsum and lime putty. This application uses blueboard, which has specially treated paper to accelerate the setting of the gypsum plaster component. This setting has far less shrinkage than the air-dry compounds normally used in drywall, so it only requires one coat. Blueboard also has square edges rather than tapered-edge drywall boards. The tapered drywall boards are used to countersink the tape in taped jointing, whereas the tape in veneer plastering is buried beneath a level surface. One coat veneer plaster over dry board is an intermediate style step between full multi-coat "wet" plaster and the limited joint-treatment-only given "dry" wall.

== Properties ==
=== Sound control ===
The method of installation and type of drywall can reduce sound transmission through walls and ceilings. Several builders' books state that thicker drywall reduces sound transmission, but engineering manuals recommend using multiple layers of drywall, sometimes of different thicknesses and glued together, or special types of drywall designed to reduce noise. Also important are the construction details of the framing with steel studs, wider stud spacing, double studding, insulation, and other details reducing sound transmission. Sound transmission class (STC) ratings can be increased from 33 for an ordinary stud-wall to as high as 59 with double 1/2-inch (13 mm) drywall on both sides of a wood stud wall with resilient channels on one side and glass wool batt insulation between the studs.

Sound transmission may be slightly reduced using regular 5/8-inch (16 mm) panels (with or without light-gauge resilient metal channels and/or insulation), but it is more effective to use two layers of drywall, sometimes in combination with other factors, or specially designed, sound-resistant drywall.

=== Water damage and molding ===
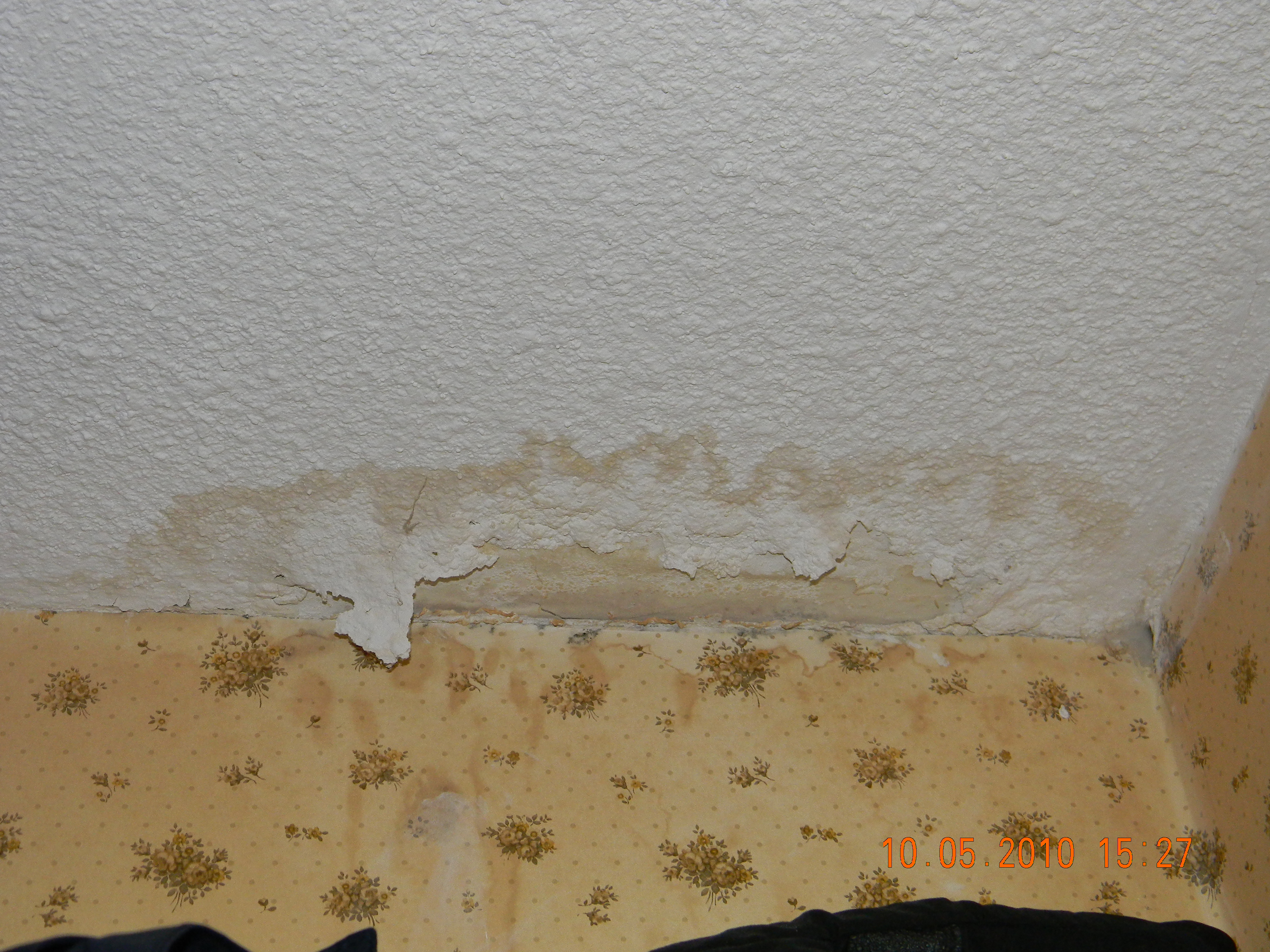
Drywall water damage in a closet

Drywall is highly vulnerable to moisture due to the inherent properties of the materials that constitute it: gypsum, paper, and organic additives and binders. Gypsum will soften with exposure to moisture and eventually turn into a gooey paste with prolonged immersion, such as during a flood. During such incidents, some, or all, of the drywall in an entire building will need to be removed and replaced. Furthermore, the paper facings and organic additives mixed with the gypsum core are food for mold.

The porosity of the board—introduced during manufacturing to reduce the board's weight, lowering construction time and transportation costs—enables water to rapidly reach the core through capillary action, where mold can grow inside. Water that enters a room from overhead may cause ceiling drywall tape to separate from the ceiling as a result of the grooves immediately behind the tape where the drywall pieces meet becoming saturated. The drywall may also soften around the screws holding the drywall in place, and with the aid of gravity, the weight of the water may cause the drywall to sag and eventually collapse, requiring replacement.

Drywall's paper facings are edible to termites, which can eat the paper if they infest a wall cavity covered with drywall. This causes the painted surface to crumble to the touch, its paper backing material being eaten. In addition to the necessity of patching the damaged surface and repainting, if enough of the paper has been eaten, the gypsum core can easily crack or crumble without it, and the drywall must be removed and replaced.

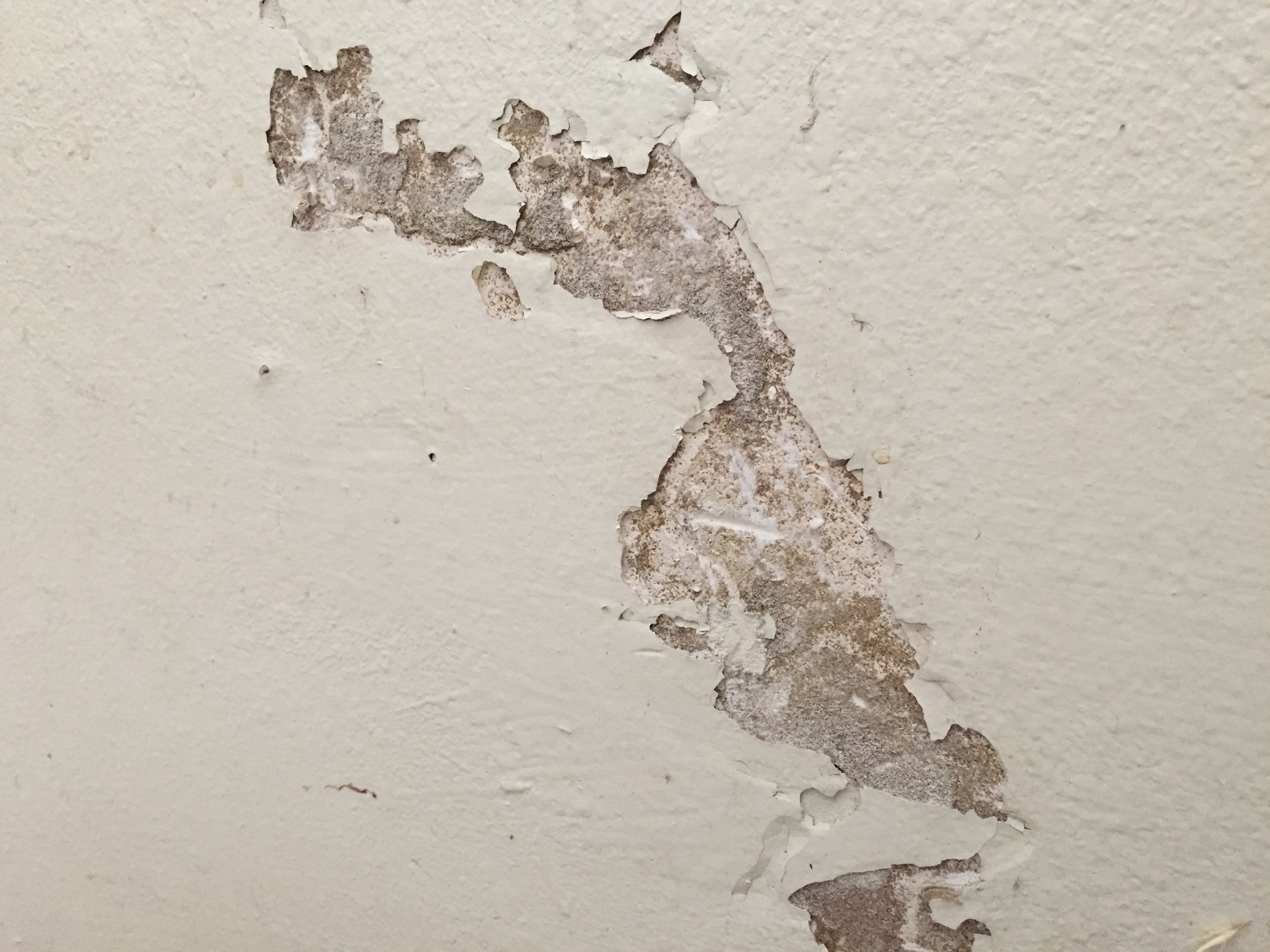
Drywall damage caused by termites eating the paper, causing the paint to crumble

In many circumstances, especially when the drywall has been exposed to water or moisture for less than 48 hours, professional restoration experts can avoid the cost, inconvenience, and difficulty of removing and replacing the affected drywall. They use rapid drying techniques that eliminate the elements required to support microbial activity while restoring most or all of the drywall.

It is for these reasons that greenboard, a type of drywall with an outer face that is wax- and/or chemically coated to resist mold growth, and ideally cement board are used for rooms expected to have high humidity, primarily kitchens, bathrooms, and laundry rooms.

==== Flood-damage-resistant materials ====
Materials marketed as waterproof drywall are in most cases moisture-resistant or flood-damage-resistant rather than genuinely waterproof, and relatively few interior wall systems can withstand direct, prolonged water contact without degrading. Under the National Flood Insurance Program (NFIP), a flood-resistant material is one able to withstand direct and prolonged contact with floodwater—at least 72 hours—without sustaining damage requiring more than low-cost cosmetic repair. United States building codes and Federal Emergency Management Agency (FEMA) guidance require flood-damage-resistant materials below the base flood elevation, the height floodwater is expected to reach in a base flood.

Some flood-resistant wall products are not gypsum-based. EnduraFlood is a wall system in which the lower portion of standard drywall is replaced with panels made from polymers and metals. NBC 6 South Florida reported that the panels resisted both fresh and salt water in a demonstration by the company's founder, and that they can be detached so the wall cavity is dried and then refitted after a flood rather than discarded—an approach consistent with wet-floodproofing guidance favoring low-level finishes that can be removed and replaced. Rigid polyvinyl chloride (PVC) and fiberglass-reinforced plastic (FRP) panel systems likewise do not absorb water and are used in basements and other moisture-prone spaces.

FEMA Technical Bulletin 2 rates wall materials by their ability to withstand floodwater contact. Standard paper-faced gypsum board is classified as unacceptable below the base flood elevation, since the facing and core absorb water and support mold growth. Moisture-resistant panels such as greenboard retain a gypsum core and are treated as only a limited improvement. Gypsum panels faced with fiberglass mats rather than paper are accepted as flood-damage-resistant, tolerating limited wetting and drying, although the core can still take up water and the panels may require replacement after submersion. Cement board and fiber-cement panels do not disintegrate when wet and are likewise accepted, but their weight and finishing requirements mean they are generally installed as substrates or tile backers rather than as finished wall surfaces.

Material choice generally follows expected exposure: standard drywall in dry interior spaces, moisture-resistant board in high-humidity rooms, fiberglass-faced gypsum or cement board in intermittently wet or flood-adjacent areas, and non-gypsum or removable systems for flood-prone lower walls and basements.

=== Other damage risks ===
Foam insulation and the gypsum part of sheetrock are easily chewed out by honeybees when they are setting up a stray nest in a building, and they want to enlarge their nest area.

=== Fire resistance ===
Some fire barrier walls are constructed of Type X drywall as a passive fire protection item. Gypsum contains water of crystallization bound in the form of hydrates. When exposed to heat or fire, the resulting decomposition reaction releases water vapor and is endothermic (it absorbs thermal energy), which retards heat transfer until the water in the gypsum is gone. The fire-resistance rating of the fire barrier assembly is increased with additional layers of drywall, up to four hours for walls and three hours for floor/ceiling assemblies. Fire-rated assemblies constructed of drywall are documented in design or certification listing catalogues, including DIN 4102 Part 4 and the Canadian Building Code.

==== Type X drywall ====
In the Type X gypsum board, special glass fibers are intermixed with the gypsum to reinforce the core of the panels. These fibers reduce the size of the cracks that form as the water is driven off, thereby extending the length of time the gypsum panels resist fire without failure.

==== Type C drywall ====
Type C gypsum panels provide stronger fire resistance than Type X. The core of Type C panels contains a higher density of glass fibers. The core of Type C panels also contains vermiculite which acts as a shrinkage-compensating additive that expands when exposed to elevated temperatures of a fire. This expansion occurs at roughly the same temperature as the calcination of the gypsum in the core, allowing the core of the Type C panels to remain dimensionally stable in a fire.

== Waste ==
Because up to 12% of drywall is wasted during the manufacturing and installation processes and the drywall material is frequently not reused, disposal can become a problem. Some landfill sites have banned the dumping of drywall. Some manufacturers take back waste wallboard from construction sites and recycle them into new wallboard. Recycled paper is typically used during manufacturing. More recently, recycling at the construction site itself has been researched. There is potential for using crushed drywall to amend certain soils at building sites, such as sodic clay and silt mixtures (bay mud), as well as using it in compost. As of 2016, industry standards are being developed to ensure that when and if wallboard is taken back for recycling, quality and composition are maintained.

== Market ==
=== North America ===
North America is one of the largest gypsum board users in the world, with a total wallboard plant capacity of 42 billion square feet (3.9 billion square metres) per year, roughly half of the worldwide annual production capacity of 85 billion square feet (7.9 billion square metres). Moreover, the homebuilding and remodeling markets in North America in the late 1990s and early 2000s increased demand. The gypsum board market was one of the biggest beneficiaries of the housing boom as "an average new American home contains more than 7.31 metric tons of gypsum."

The introduction in March 2005 of the Clean Air Interstate Rule by the United States Environmental Protection Agency requires fossil-fuel power plants to "cut sulfur dioxide emissions by 73%" by 2018. The Clean Air Interstate Rule also requested that the power plants install new scrubbers (industrial pollution control devices) to remove sulfur dioxide present in the output waste gas. Scrubbers use the technique of flue-gas desulfurization (FGD), which produces synthetic gypsum as a usable by-product. In response to the new supply of this raw material, the gypsum board market was predicted to shift significantly. However, issues such as mercury release during calcining need to be resolved.

== Controversies ==
=== High-sulfur drywall illness and corrosion issues ===
A substantial amount of defective drywall was imported into the United States from China and incorporated into tens of thousands of homes during rebuilding in 2006 and 2007 following Hurricane Katrina and in other places. Complaints included the structure's foul odour, health effects, and metal corrosion. The emission of sulfurous gases causes this. The same drywall was sold in Asia without problems resulting, but US homes are built much more tightly than homes in China, with less ventilation. Volatile sulfur compounds, including hydrogen sulfide, have been detected as emissions from the imported drywall and may be linked to health problems. These compounds are emitted from many different types of drywall.

Several lawsuits are underway in many jurisdictions, but many of the sheets of drywall are simply marked "Made in China", thus making the manufacturer's identification difficult. An investigation by the Consumer Product Safety Commission, CPSC, was underway in 2009. In November 2009, the CPSC reported a "strong association" between Chinese drywall and corrosion of pipes and wires reported by thousands of homeowners in the United States. The issue was resolved in 2011, and now all drywall must be tested for volatile sulfur, and any containing more than ten ppm is unable to be sold in the US.

== Variants ==
The following variants available in Canada or the United States are listed below:

- Regular white board, from 1/4 to 3/4 inch (6.3 to 19 mm) thickness
- Fire-resistant ("Type X"), different thicknesses and multiple layers of wallboard provide increased fire rating based on the time a specific wall assembly can withstand a standardized fire test. Often perlite, vermiculite, and boric acid are added to improve fire resistance.
- Greenboard, the drywall containing an oil-based additive in the green-colored paper covering, provides moisture resistance. It is commonly used in bathrooms and other areas expected to experience elevated humidity levels.
- Blueboard, blue face paper forms a strong bond with a skim coat or a built-up plaster finish, providing water and mold resistance.
- Cement board, which is more water-resistant than greenboard, for use in showers or sauna rooms, and as a base for ceramic tile.
- Soundboard is made from wood fibers to increase the sound transmission class.
- Soundproof drywall is a laminated drywall made with gypsum and other materials such as damping polymers to significantly increase the sound transmission class rating.
- Mold-resistant, paperless drywall with fiberglass face
- Enviroboard, a board made from recycled agricultural materials
- Lead-lined drywall, a drywall used around radiological equipment.
- Foil-backed drywall used as a vapor barrier.
- Controlled density (CD), also called ceiling board, which is available only in 1/2 inch (13 mm) thickness and is significantly stiffer than the regular whiteboard.
- EcoRock, a drywall that uses a combination of 20 materials including recycled fly ash, slag, kiln dust and fillers and no starch cellulose; it is advertised as being environmentally friendly due to the use of recycled materials and an energy efficient process.
- Gypsum "Firecode C". This board is similar in composition to Type X, except for more glass fibres and a form of the vermiculite used to reduce shrinkage. When exposed to high heat, the gypsum core shrinks, but this additive expands at about the same rate, so the gypsum core is more stable in a fire and remains in place even after the gypsum dries up.

== Specifications ==
=== Australia and New Zealand ===
The term plasterboard is used in Australia and New Zealand. In Australia, the product is often called Gyprock, the name of the largest plasterboard manufacturer. In New Zealand it is also called Gibraltar and Gib board, genericised from the registered trademark ("GIB") of the locally made product that dominates the local market. A specific type of Gibraltar board for use in wet conditions (such as bathrooms and kitchens) is known as AquaGib.

It is made in thicknesses of 10 mm, 13 mm, and 16 mm, and sometimes other thicknesses up to 25 mm. Panels are commonly sold in 1200 mm-wide sheets, which may be 1800, 2400, 3000, 4800, or 6000 mm in length. Sheets are usually secured to either timber or cold-formed steel frames anywhere from 150 to 300 mm centres along the beam and 400 to 600 mm across members.

In both countries, plasterboard has become a widely used replacement for scrim and sarking walls in renovating 19th- and early 20th-century buildings.

=== Canada and the United States ===
Drywall panels in Canada and the United States are made in widths of 48, 54, and 96 inches (1.2, 1.4, and 2.4 m) and varying lengths to suit the application. The most common width is 48 inches; however, 54-inch-wide panels are becoming more popular as 9-foot (2.7 m) ceiling heights become more common. Lengths up to 16 feet (4.9 m) are common; the most common is 8 feet (2.4 m). Common thicknesses are 1/2 and 5/8 inch (13 and 16 mm); thicknesses of 1/4, 3/8, 3/4, and 1 inch (6, 10, 19, and 25 mm) are used in specific applications. In many parts of Canada, drywall is commonly referred to as Gyproc.

=== Europe ===
In Europe, most plasterboard is made in sheets 120 centimetres (47 in) wide; sheets 60 and 90 centimetres (24 and 35 in) wide are also made. Plasterboard 120 centimetres (47 in) wide is most commonly made in 240-centimetre (94 in) lengths; sheets of 250, 260, 270, 280, and 300 centimetres (98, 102, 106, 110, and 118 in) and longer also are common. Thicknesses of plasterboard available are 9.5 to 25 millimetres (3/8 to 1 in).

Plasterboard is commonly made with one of three edge treatments: tapered edge, where the long edges of the board are tapered with a wide bevel at the front to allow jointing materials to be finished flush with the main board face; plain edge, used where the whole surface will receive a thin coating (skim coat) of finishing plaster; and beveled on all four sides, used in products specialized for roofing. Major UK manufacturers do not offer four-sided chamfered drywall for general use.

== See also ==
- Certification mark
- Chinese drywall
- Clay panel
- Compartmentalization (engineering)
- Endothermic process
- Fire protection
- Firewall (construction)
- Homasote
- Knockdown texture
- Magnesium oxide wallboard
- Product certification
