= Enviroboard =

Enviroboard is a paper-like or cardboard-like construction and packaging material, generally manufactured using compressed, ecologically safe, agricultural material. Most often this means employing the use of high-cellulose waste fibres, such as the post-harvest straw of rice, barley, wheat, and elephant grass or alternatively, a more urban waste stream such as newspaper fibre.

Construction panels built from agricultural wastes have been around for hundreds of years, especially in Central and Eastern Europe where pressed leaves and straw were used as insulation and even structural material. Environmental board panels should not be confused with straw bale construction which does not process waste fibres into a compressed standardized board panel.

The concept of environmental construction panels dovetails with the principles of sustainability, namely reducing the impact that the entire life-cycle of constructing built environments has on the environment.

The Securities and Exchange Commission filed fraud charges against Enviroboard on 29 August 2016.

== See also ==
- Clay panel
