= Non-load bearing wall =

A non-load bearing wall or non-bearing wall is a type of wall used in building construction that is not a load-bearing wall. That is, it is a wall that does not support the weight of structure other than the wall itself.

Walls that fall into this category include:

- Most interior walls
- Infill wall
- Curtain wall (architecture)
- Partition walls

== See also ==
- Non-loadbearing
