= Drywall mechanic =

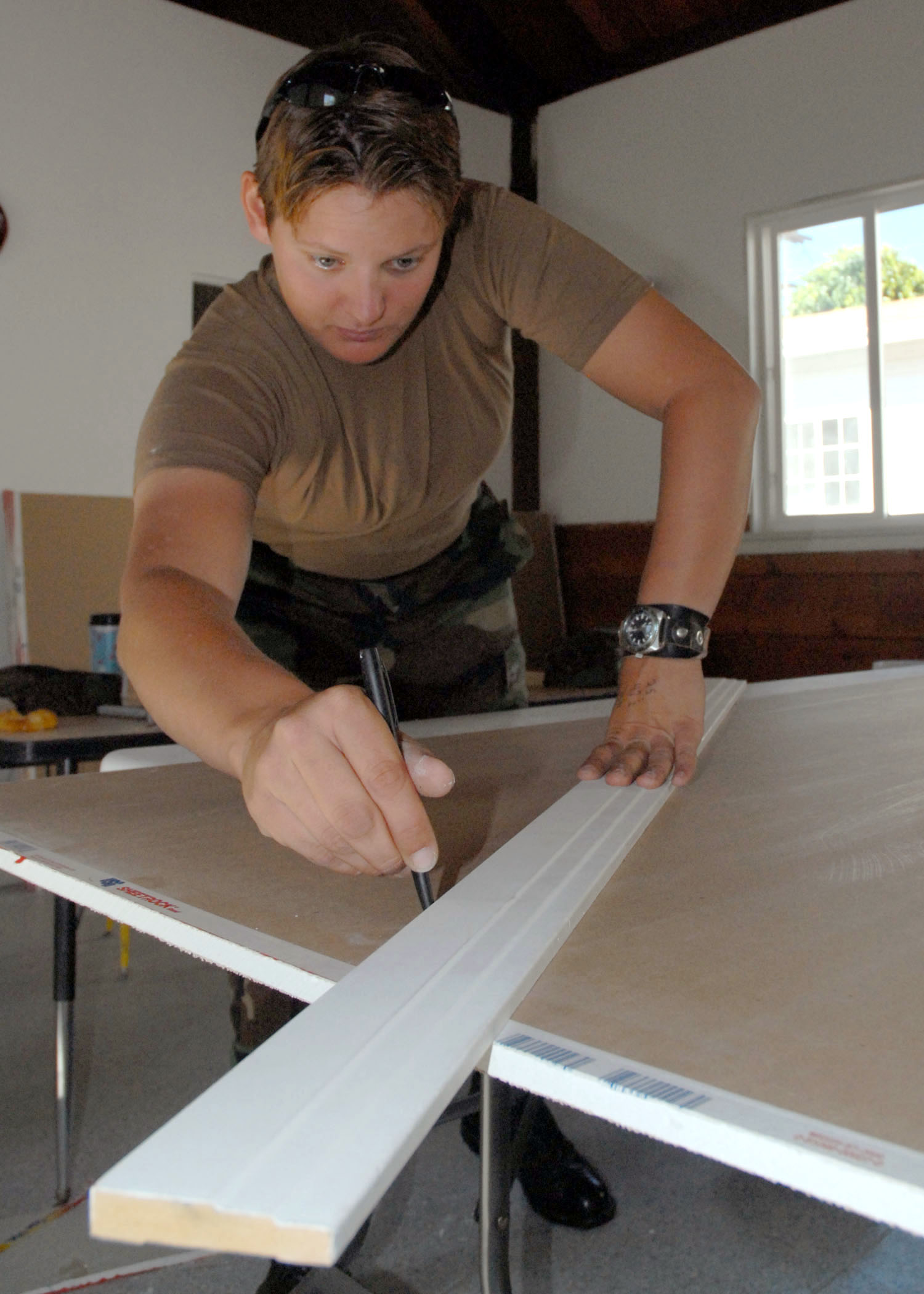
A drywall mechanic marks a sheet to cut.

Drywallers or drywall mechanics erect and finish drywall panels in structures. The position can include, in some cases, the installation of door and window frames, a variety of acoustical ceilings, moldings and trim, and thermal and sound insulation. It can also overlap with carpentry and framing, in that a drywaller might install wood or metal wall studs in a structure.

It can range from an entry-level position to a skilled trade, with a number of certifications available. A drywall mechanic can work for a construction firm, or work privately.

== Health hazards ==
Health hazards include the dangers of toxic poisoning from the fumes and dust of paints and related materials. Construction workers who sand drywall joint compound are often exposed to high concentrations of dusts, talc, calcite, mica, gypsum, and in some cases, respirable silica. Some of these have been associated with varying degrees of eye, nose, throat, and respiratory tract irritation.

Over time, breathing the dust from drywall joint compounds may cause persistent throat and airway irritation, coughing, phlegm production, and breathing difficulties similar to asthma. When silica is present, workers may also face an increased risk of silicosis and lung cancer. There are also asbestos and mold health issues in removing old drywall, as well as lead paint on drywall first painted several decades ago. For all of these reasons, constant use of a respirator is widely recommended, and even required by some labor authorities. Potential falls from elevated work platforms or ladders are another risk.

Joint compound mixes manufactured prior to the 1980s often contained a complex mixture of several substances. Among the additives used were asbestos fibers, which provided cohesiveness. Exposure to friable asbestos increases risks of various serious health conditions, including cancer. Joint compounds manufactured from 1980 onward were required to have asbestos removed in favor of other compounds due to legislation to ban asbestos' widespread use.

For all of these reasons, constant use of a respirator is recommended by almost all drywall compound manufacturers and is required by some labor authorities.
