= Du Noüy–Padday method =

Lab technique for measuring surface tension

The du Noüy–Padday method is a minimized version of the du Noüy ring method replacing the large platinum ring with a thin rod that is used to measure equilibrium surface tension or dynamic surface tension at an air–liquid interface. In this method, the rod is oriented perpendicular to the interface, and the force exerted on it is measured. Based on the work of Padday, this method finds wide use in the preparation and monitoring of Langmuir–Blodgett films, ink & coating development, pharmaceutical screening, and academic research.

== Detailed description ==
The du Noüy Padday rod consists of a rod usually on the order of a few millimeters square making a small ring. The rod is often made from a composite metal material that may be roughened to ensure complete wetting at the interface. The rod is cleaned with water, alcohol and a flame or with strong acid to ensure complete removal of surfactants. The rod is attached to a scale or balance via a thin metal hook. The Padday method uses the maximum pull force method, i.e. the maximum force due to the surface tension is recorded as the probe is first immersed ca. one mm into the solution and then slowly withdrawn from the interface. The main forces acting on a probe are the buoyancy (due to the volume of liquid displaced by the probe) and the mass of the meniscus adhering to the probe. This is an old, reliable, and well-documented technique.

An important advantage of the maximum pull force technique is that the receding contact angle on the probe is effectively zero. The maximum pull force is obtained when the buoyancy force reaches its minimum,

The surface tension measurement used in the Padday devices based on the du Noüy ring/maximum pull force method is explained further here:

The force acting on the probe can be divided into two components:

i) Buoyancy stemming from the volume displaced by the probe, and
ii) the mass of the meniscus of the liquid adhering to the probe.

The latter is in equilibrium with the surface tension force, i.e.

$$\tau_p \gamma \cos \theta = m_m g$$

where

- $\tau_p$ is the perimeter of the probe,
- $m_m$ is the surface tension and the weight of the meniscus under the probe. In the situation considered here the volume displaced by the probe is included in the meniscus.
- $\theta$ is the contact angle between the probe and the solution that is measured, and is negligible for the majority of solutions with Kibron’s probes.

Thus, the force measured by the balance is given by

$$F_p = m_m g + F_{buoyancy} = \tau_p\gamma\ + F_{buoyancy}$$

where

- $F_p$ is the force acting on the probe and
- $F_{buoyancy}$ is the force due to buoyancy.

At the point of detachment the volume of the probe immersed in the solution vanishes, and thus, also the buoyancy term. This is observed as a maximum in the force curve, which relates to the surface tension through

$$\gamma = \frac{F_{max}}{\tau_p}$$

The above derivation holds for ideal conditions. Non-idealities, e.g. from defect probe shape, are partly compensated in the calibration routine using a solution with known surface tension.

== Advantages and practice ==
Unlike a du Noüy ring, no correction factors are required when calculating surface tensions. Due to its small size the rod can be used in high throughput instruments that use a 96-well plate to determine the surface tension. The small diameter of the rod allows its use in a small volume of liquid with 50 $\mu$l samples being used in some devices.

In addition, the rod also allows use for the Wilhelmy method because the rod is not completely removed during measurements. For this the dynamic surface tension can be used for accurate determination of surface kinetics on a wide range of timescales.

The Padday technique also offers low operator variance and does not need an anti-vibration table. This advantage over other devices allows the Padday devices to be used in the field easily. The rod when made of composite material is also less likely to bend and therefore cheaper than the more costly platinum rod offered in the du Noüy method.

In a typical experiment, the rod is lowered using a manual or automatic device to the surface being analyzed until a meniscus is formed, and then raised so that the bottom edge of the rod lies on the plane of the undisturbed surface. One disadvantage of this technique is that it can not bury the rod into the surface to measure interfacial tension between two liquids.

== Practical uses ==
The practical uses of an instrument that uses a single probe are that it allows for the developing of a high throughput device. A high throughput surface tension device can be used for formulation in real time for understanding the penetration of drugs in the blood–brain barrier (BBB), understanding the solubility of drugs, development of a screen to test a drugs toxicity, determining the physicochemical properties of oxidized phospholipids, and development of new surfactant/polymers.

=== Penetration of drugs in the BBB ===
The physicochemical profiling of poorly soluble drug candidates performed using a HTS surface tension device. Allowed prediction of penetration through the blood–brain barrier.

=== Development of a screen to test a drugs toxicity ===
A correlation with drug-lipid-complexes were correlated with high-throughput surface tension device to predict phospholipidosis in particular cationic drugs.

=== Understanding the solubility of drugs ===
Drug solubility has previously been done by the shaker method. A 96-well high throughput device has allowed development of a new method to test drugs.

=== Oxidized Phospholipids ===
The physicochemical properties of oxidized lipids were characterized using a high throughput device. Since these oxidized lipids are expensive and only available in small quantities a surface tension device requiring only a small amount of volume is better.

=== Development of new surfactant/polymers ===
The surface tension profiles of the branched copolymers solutions were performed using a HTS surface tensiometer as a function polymer concentration to produce pH-triggered aggregation emulsion droplets.

== See also ==
- Tensiometer (surface tension)
- du Noüy ring method
- Sessile drop technique
- Wilhelmy plate method
