= Meniscus (liquid) =

Curve in a liquid's surface due to adhesion to the container walls

A: The bottom of a concave meniscus. B: The top of a convex meniscus.

In physics (particularly liquid statics), the meniscus (pl.: menisci, from Greek 'crescent') is the curve in the upper surface of a liquid close to the surface of the container or another object, produced by surface tension.

A concave meniscus occurs when the attraction between the particles of the liquid and the container is more than half the attraction of the particles of the liquid to each other, causing the liquid to climb the walls of the container. This occurs between water and glass. Water-based fluids like sap, honey, and milk also have a concave meniscus in glass or other wettable containers.

Conversely, a convex meniscus occurs when the adhesion energy is less than half the cohesion energy. For example, convex menisci occur between mercury and glass in barometers and thermometers.

In general, the shape of the surface of a liquid can be complex. For a sufficiently narrow tube with circular cross-section, the shape of the meniscus will approximate a section of a spherical surface, while for a large container, most of the upper surface of the liquid will be almost flat, only curving up (if concave) or down (if convex) near the edges.

== Contact angle and surface tension ==
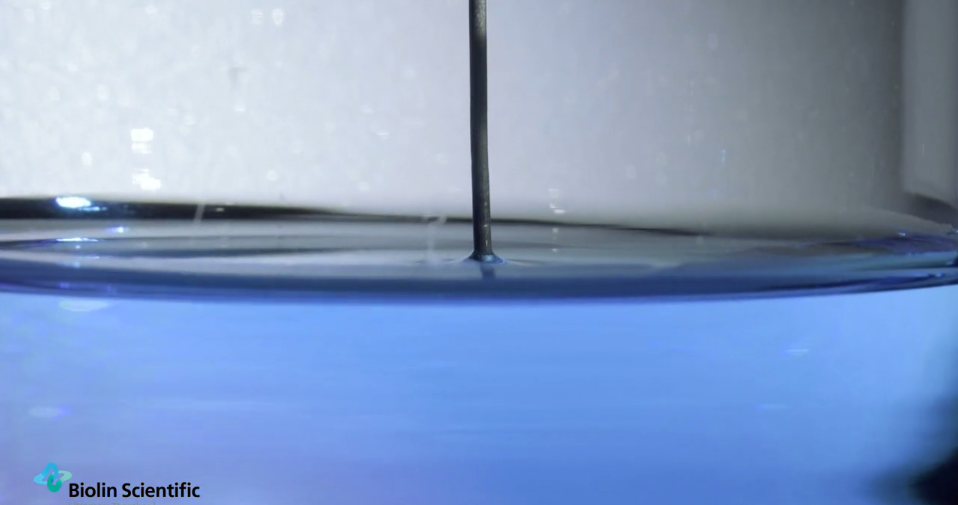
Menisci on a thin fiber

The formation of menisci is commonly used in surface science to measure contact angles and surface tension. In a contact angle measurement, the shape of the menisci is measured with a balance or optically with a digital camera. In a surface tension measurement, the measurement probe has a contact angle of zero and the surface tension can be obtained by measuring the mass of the menisci. This is typically done with a Wilhelmy plate.

== Measurement of volumes ==
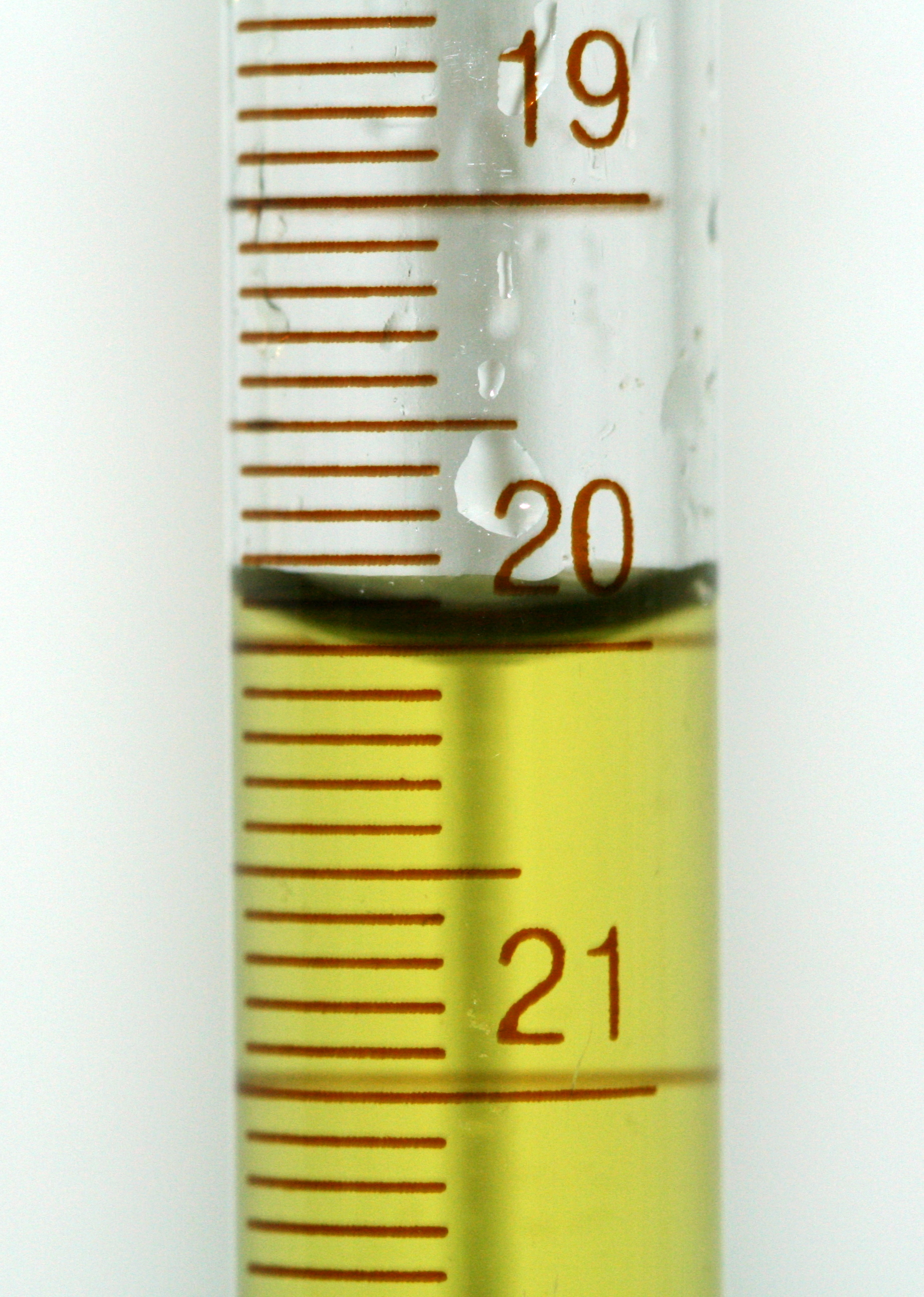
A meniscus as seen in a burette of colored water. '20.00 mL' is the correct depth measurement.

When reading a depth scale on the side of an instrument filled with liquid, such as a water level device, the meniscus must be taken into account in order to obtain an accurate measurement. Depth must be measured with the meniscus at eye level (to eliminate parallax error) and at the center of the meniscus, i.e. the top of a convex meniscus or the bottom of a concave meniscus.

Manufacturers of glassware and other tools calibrate their measurement marks to account for the meniscus. This means that any instrument is calibrated for a specific liquid, usually water.

== Capillary action ==
Menisci are a manifestation of capillary action, by which either surface adhesion pulls a liquid up to form a concave meniscus, or internal cohesion pulls the liquid down to form a convex meniscus. This phenomenon is important in transpirational pull in plants. When a tube of a narrow bore, often called a capillary tube, is dipped into a liquid and the liquid wets the tube (with zero contact angle), the liquid surface inside the tube forms a concave meniscus, which is a virtually spherical surface having the same radius, r, as the inside of the tube. The tube experiences a downward force of magnitude 2πrσ, where σ is the surface tension of the liquid.

== See also ==
- Capillary pressure – Pressure between two fluids from forces between the fluids and tube walls
- Capillary surface – Surface representing the interface between two different fluids
- Du Noüy ring method – Method of measuring a liquid's surface tension
- Rollin film – Liquid film of superfluid helium; another mechanism of side-wall surface adhesion
- Sessile drop technique – Method of determining the surface energy of a solid
- Tensiometer (surface tension) – Instrument which measures surface tension
- Young–Laplace equation – Describing pressure difference over an interface in fluid mechanics
