= Lecomte =

Lecomte is a French surname.

== Lecomte ==
- Lecomte (horse), American racehorse 1850
- Lecomte Stakes, American graded horse race
- Lecomte (archer), archer in 1900 Olympics
- Amine Lecomte (born 1990), Qatar international footballer
- Benjamin Lecomte (born 1991), French footballer
- Benoît Lecomte (born 1967), French swimmer
- Bernard Lecomte (businessman) (born 1943), French businessman
- Bernard Lecomte (writer) (born 1949), French writer and journalist
- Felix Lecomte (1737-1817), French sculptor
- Gerard Lecomte (1926-1997), French professor of Arabic and other Eastern Languages
- Georges Lecomte (1867-1958), French writer, member of the French Academy
- Hermine Lecomte du Noüy (1854-1915), French writer
- Hippolyte Lecomte (1791-1857), painter of French history
- Isabelle Lecomte (born 1967), Belgian writer
- Manu Lecomte (born 1995), Belgian basketball player in the Israeli Basketball Premier League
- Marcel Lecomte (1900-1966), Belgian writer
- Paul Henri Lecomte (1856-1934), French botanist whose standard author abbreviation is Lecomte
- Tristan Lecomte, French founder of fair trade product importers Alter Eco
- Loana Lecomte, French cross-country and mountain bike cyclist.
- Louis le Comte (1655–1728), French Jesuit

== Complex names ==
- Jean-Jules-Antoine Lecomte du Nouy (1842-1923), French painter and sculptor
- Pierre Lecomte du Noüy (1883-1947), French mathematician, biophysicist, writer and philosopher
- Roger Gilbert-Lecomte (1907-1943), French writer
