= Maximum bubble pressure method =

Method of measuring surface tension

In physics, the maximum bubble pressure method, or in short bubble pressure method, is a technique to measure the surface tension of a liquid, with surfactants.

== Background ==
When the liquid forms an interface with a gas phase, a molecule on the border has quite different physical properties due to the unbalance of attracting forces by the neighboring molecules. At the equilibrium state of the liquid, interior molecules are under the balanced forces with uniformly distributed adjacent molecules.

However, relatively fewer number of molecules in the gas phase above the interface than condensed liquid phase makes overall sum of forces applied to the surface molecule direct inside of the liquid and thus surface molecules tend to minimize their own surface area.

Such an inequality of molecular forces induces continuous movement of molecules from the inside to the surface, which means the surface molecules has extra energy, which is called surface free energy or potential energy, and such an energy acting on reduced unit area is defined as surface tension.

This is a frame work to interpret relevant phenomena which occurs surface or interface of materials and a number of methods to measure the surface tension has been developed.

Among the various ways to determine surface tension, Du Noüy ring method and Wilhelmy slide method are based on the separation of a solid object from the liquid surface, and Pendant drop method and Sessile drop or bubble method depend on the deformation of the spherical shape of a liquid drop.

Even though these methods are relatively simple and commonly used to determine the static surface tension, in case that the impurities are added to the liquid, measurement of surface tension based on the dynamic equilibrium should be applied since it takes more time to obtain a completely formed surface and this means that it is difficult to achieve the static equilibrium as a pure liquid does.

The most typical impurity to induce dynamic surface tension measurement is a surfactant molecule which has both of hydrophilic segment, generally called “head group” and hydrophobic segment, generally called “tail group” in a same molecule. Due to the characteristic molecular structure, surfactants migrate to the liquid surface bordering gas phase until an external force disperse the accumulated molecules from the interface or surface is fully occupied and thus cannot accommodate extra molecules. During this process, surface tension decrease as function of time and finally approach the equilibrium surface tension (σ_{equilibrium}). Such a process is illustrated in figure 1. (Image was reproduced from reference)

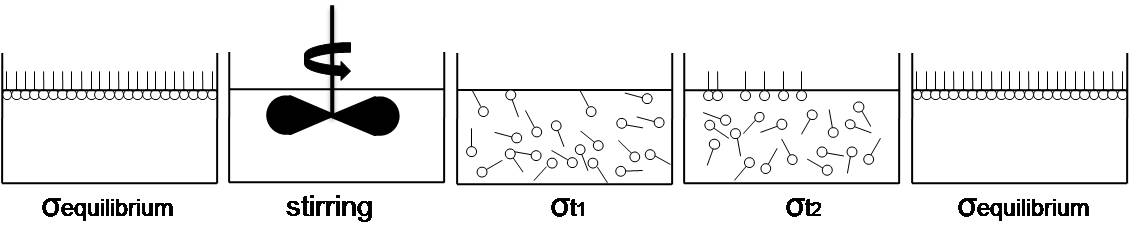
Figure 1: Migration of surfactant molecules and change of surface tension (σ_{t1} > σ_{t2} > σ_{equilibrium}).

== Maximum bubble pressure method ==
One of the useful methods to determine the dynamic surface tension is measuring the "maximum bubble pressure method" or, simply, bubble pressure method.

Bubble pressure tensiometer produces gas bubbles (ex. air) at constant rate and blows them through a capillary which is submerged in the sample liquid and its radius is already known.

The pressure (P) inside of the gas bubble continues to increase and the maximum value is obtained when the bubble has the completely hemispherical shape whose radius is exactly corresponding to the radius of the capillary.

Figure 2 shows each step of bubble formation and corresponding change of bubble radius and each step is described below. (Image was reproduced from reference)

Figure 2: Change of pressure during bubble formation plotted as a function of added volume.

Initially a bubble appears on the end of the capillary. As the size increases, the radius of curvature of the bubble decreases.

At the point of the maximum bubble pressure, the bubble has a complete hemispherical shape whose radius is identical to the radius of the capillary denoted by Rcap. The surface tension can be determined using the Young–Laplace equation in the reduced form for spherical bubble shape within the liquid.

$\sigma=\frac{\Delta P_{\rm {max}} \times R_{\rm {cap}}}{2}$

(σ: surface tension, ΔP_{max}: maximum pressure drop, R_{cap}: radius of capillary)

Later, after the maximum pressure, the pressure of the bubble decreases and the radius of the bubble increases until the bubble is detached from the end of a capillary and a new cycle begins. This is not relevant to determine the surface tension.

Currently developed and commercialized tensiometers monitors the pressure needed to form a bubble, the pressure difference between inside and outside the bubble, the radius of the bubble, and the surface tension of the sample are calculated in one time and a data acquisition is carried out via PC control.

Bubble pressure method is commonly used to measure the dynamic surface tension for the system containing surfactants or other impurities because it does not require contact angle measurement and has high accuracy even though the measurement is done rapidly. “Bubble pressure method” can be applied to measure the dynamic surface tension, particularly for the systems which contain surfactants. Moreover, this method is an appropriate technique to apply to biological fluids like serum because it does not require a large amount of liquid sample for the measurements. Finally, the method is used for an indirect determination of the surfactant content of industrial cleaning or coating baths because the dynamic surface tension in a particular range of bubble formation rates shows a strong correlation with the concentration.
