= Captive bubble method =

Method for measuring contact angle between a liquid and a solid

The captive bubble method is a method for measuring the contact angle between a liquid and a solid, by using drop shape analysis. In this method, a bubble of air is injected beneath a solid, the surface of which is located in the liquid, instead of placing a drop on the solid as in the case of the sessile drop technique. A liquid and a solid are replaced by using drop shape analysis.

The method is particularly suitable for solids with high surface energy, where liquids spread out. Hydrogels, such as those that comprise soft contact lenses, are inaccessible to the standard arrangement; so the captive bubble method is also used in such cases. A contact angle is formed on a smooth, periodically heterogeneous solid surface. Above the solid surface, a liquid drop is submerged in a fluid. The measurement of contact angles usually contributes to the measurement of the surface energy of solids in the industry. Different from other methods of measuring the contact angle, such as the sessile drop technique, the system utilized in the captive bubble method has the fluid bubble attached from below to the solid surface, such that both the liquid bubble and the solid interact with a fluid.

== Application and significance ==
=== Surface energy of solids ===
As a system is formed from a solid surface and a drop of liquid, energy minima and maxima are produced by the free energy of the system. When the solid surface is rough or homogeneous, the system (made up of a solid, a liquid, and a fluid) could have multiple minima produced from the free energy at different minima points. One of these minima is the global minimum. The global minimum has the lowest free energy within the system and is defined as the stable equilibrium state. Furthermore, the other minima illustrate the metastable equilibrium states of the system. In between these minima are energy barriers that hinder the motion of energy between the various metastable states in the system. The transition of energy between metastable states is also affected by the availability of external energy to the system, which is associated with the volume of the liquid drop on top of the solid surface. As such, the volume of the liquid may have an impact on the locations of the minima points, which could influence the contact angles created by the solid and the liquid. The contact angles are directly related to whether the solid surface is ideal, or, in other words, whether it is a smooth, heterogeneous surface.

=== Surface analysis of reverse osmosis membrane ===
The measurement of contact angles with the captive bubble method could also be useful in the surface analysis of the reverse osmosis membrane in the study of membrane performances. Through the analysis of contact angles, the properties of membranes, such as roughness, can be determined. The roughness of membranes, which indicates the effective surface area, can further lead to the investigation of the hydrophilic and hydrophobic properties of the surface. Through studies, a higher contact angle may correspond to a more hydrophobic surface in membrane analysis. In the performance of the captive bubble method in membrane analysis, several factors can have an influence on the contact angle, including the bubble volume, liquid types, and tensions.

=== Surface tensions of lung surface active material ===
In comparison to the use of the captive bubble method in the measurement of contact angles in other cases, the contact angle in the study of the lung surfactant monolayer is kept at a constant 180 degrees, due to the property of the hydrated agar gel on the ceiling of the bubble. The system applied in the study of lung surfactant is designed to be a leak-proof system, ensuring the independence of the surface film of bubbles from other materials and substances like plastic walls, barriers, and outlets. Instead of adding extra tubing or piercing the bubble air-water interface with needles, this closed system is created by adjusting the pressure within the closed sample chamber by adding or removing aqueous media to regulate the bubble size and surface tension of insoluble films at the bubble surface.

Since the bubble volumes are controlled by modifying the pressure in the sample chamber, the surface area and the surface tension of the surfactant film at the bubble surface are reduced as the volume of the bubble decreases.

The bubble shape, in this case, can vary from spherical to oval depending on the surface tension, which can be calculated through the measurement of the height and diameter of bubbles. In addition to measuring the surface tension, bubble formation can also be utilized in the measurement of the adsorption of lung surfactant, which defines how quickly substances build up on the air-liquid interface of pulmonary surfactants to form a film.

There are two methods to measure adsorption with captive bubbles:

1. One method of forming bubbles to measure adsorption is to begin with a small bubble of a diameter of 2–3 mm in a chamber with a diameter of 10 mm, then expand or compress it later. The bubble is first introduced into the chamber with a small plastic tubing attached to a 50uL microsyringe. It is then expanded through a sudden decrease in pressure inside the captive bubble or an increase in chamber volume by moving the piston on the end of the glass cylinder. To calculate the exact adsorption rate, the initial amount of surfactant on the bubble surface before volume modification has to be taken into consideration.
2. Another method of measuring adsorption is to start a bubble with a fixed volume instead of a given size or diameter by utilizing a needle on the bottom inlet of the bubble chamber. The fixed volume to start with is usually 200 ml, which is around 7 mm in diameter. Just as in the first method, the accumulation of material on the bubble surface during bubble formation has to be calculated in order to evaluate the exact rate of adsorption.

== Comparisons between sessile drop technique and captive bubble method ==
The sessile drop method is another popular way to measure contact angles and is done by placing a two-dimensional drop on a solid surface and controlling the volume of liquid in the drop. The sessile drop method and the captive bubble method are usually interchangeable when performing experiments, as they are both based on the properties of symmetry. Specifically, the axis of symmetry of the drop or bubble makes the contact line of the drop or bubble with the solid surface circular. This creates an observable contact angle corresponding to the contact radius of the drop or bubble.

However, interacting with a rough homogeneous surface in measurements of contact angles, the drop and bubble each present different behaviors in the measuring process, which are related to the volume of liquid and contact angles.

1. On a rough homogeneous surface, the observed contact angle may not represent the actual contact angle with a local slope since it may not be observable on a rough surface. The observed contact angle on a rough surface is also called an apparent angle, which is equivalent to the sum of the intrinsic contact angle and the local surface slope at the tangent of the contact slope for a drop or bubble. With the sessile drop method, the observed contact angle usually underestimates the intrinsic contact angle, while the observed contact angle in the captive bubble method overestimates the intrinsic contact angle of the rough surface.
2. If a graph is plotted, respectively, for the measurements of contact angles using the sessile drop method and the captive bubble method concerning the volume of liquid within the drop or bubble and the measured contact angle, the geometrical relationships illustrate different characteristics for each method. In consideration of the relationship between contact angles and the position of the contact for a certain volume in the drop or bubble, the highest and lowest possible contact angles on volume are dependent on each other differently in the two methods.
3. For the amplitude of oscillations shown in the graph, both the drop and the captive bubble display a similar order of magnitude at a relatively low contact angle. On the other hand, on a rough surface with a relatively high contact angle, the amplitude shown for the drop is larger than that of a captive bubble. The amplitude of oscillation of the lowest and highest possible contact angle demonstrates the difference between the drop method and the captive bubble method, in which the amplitude of the graph of the captive bubble method is comparatively larger than that of the graph of the sessile drop method.
4. In terms of the wavelength of the graph, the wavelength for both methods spans over a large range of volumes of liquid on the solid surface. Differences in the behavior of the drop and the bubble vary from the lowest possible contact angles to the highest possible contact angles.
