= Ludwig Wilhelmy =

German scientist (1812–1864)

Ludwig Ferdinand Wilhelmy (25 December 1812, Stargard in Pommern – 18 February 1864, Berlin) was a German scientist who is usually credited with publishing the first quantitative study in chemical kinetics.

== Early life and education ==
Ludwig Ferdinand Wilhelmy was born in Pomerania, where he completed his early schooling before moving to Berlin to study pharmacy. After his studies, Wilhelmy returned to Pomerania and bought an apothecary shop, joining his father's business. However, driven by a desire for scientific research, he sold the shop in 1843 and pursued studies in chemistry and physics at the universities of Berlin, Giessen, and Heidelberg.

== Academic achievements ==
In 1846, Wilhelmy was awarded a doctorate from the University of Heidelberg for his dissertation on the topic of heat as a measure of cohesion. After completing his studies, Wilhelmy traveled extensively in Italy and Paris, studying under notable scientists including Regnault. Upon returning to Heidelberg, he became a Privatdozent in 1849. Despite his academic success, Wilhelmy left the university after five years and returned to private life in Berlin, dedicating himself to studies in philosophy, mathematics, and physics. He remained unmarried, focusing entirely on his scholarly pursuits.

== Contributions to science ==
Wilhelmy is renowned for being the first to measure the velocity of a homogeneous chemical reaction. In 1850, he published a significant paper on the action of acids on cane sugar. This work was initially overlooked but gained recognition in 1884 when Wilhelm Ostwald highlighted its importance. Wilhelmy's experimental approach involved using a polarimeter to monitor the reaction, establishing a fundamental law of reaction velocity.

Additionally, Wilhelmy made substantial contributions to the study of capillary action, although his work was unfinished at the time of his death. His research in this area was conducted in his home laboratory, which he established in both his Berlin residence and his summer villa in Heidelberg.

== Scientific work ==
Wilhelmy studied at Heidelberg, earning a doctorate in 1846. He worked as a Privatdozent from 1849 to 1854 before moving to Berlin.

Wilhelmy's work in chemical kinetics concerned the acid-catalyzed conversion of a sucrose solution into a 1:1 mixture of fructose and glucose, a reaction that he followed with a polarimeter. He wrote a differential equation to describe the reaction, integrated it, and used it to interpret his experimental results. Wilhelmy found that the reaction's rate was proportional to the concentrations of sucrose and of acid present. He also examined the influence of temperature on the reaction.

According to Moore, Wilhelmy received little credit from his contemporaries for his early investigations in the field of chemical kinetics. It has been speculated that the strong physical-chemical orientation of Wilhelmy's work, the new method of polarimetry, and the fact that Wilhelmy was relatively unknown all led to this situation. Similar laboratory results were published by Jacobus Henricus van 't Hoff and Svante Arrhenius 30 years later, with a much greater impact.

Wilhelmy is also known for the Wilhelmy plate method for measuring surface tensions.

== See also ==
- Chemical kinetics
- Wilhelmy plate
