= Pierre Lecomte du Noüy =

French biophysicist and philosopher (1883–1947)

- Born: December 20, 1883; Paris, France
- Died: September 22, 1947 (aged 63); New York City, United States
- Known for: Du Noüy ring tensiometer Du Noüy ring method Telefinalist hypothesis
- Scientific career
- Fields: Biophysics
- Workplaces: Rockefeller Institute; Pasteur Institute

Signature
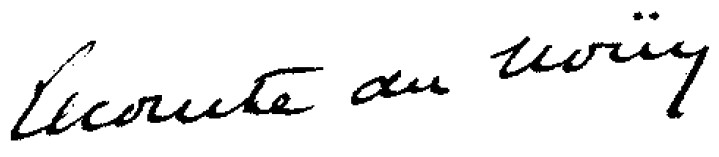

Pierre Lecomte du Noüy (French pronunciation: [ləkɔ̃t dy nwi]; 20 December 1883 – 22 September 1947) was a French biophysicist and philosopher. He is probably best remembered by scientists for his work on the surface tension, and other properties, of liquids.

== Biography ==
Du Noüy, a descendant of the French dramatist Pierre Corneille, was born in Paris, France, to a family of artists and intellectuals. His father, Émile André Lecomte du Nouÿ, known as André Lecomte du Noüy (1844 – 1914) (Note: Different sources show both orthographies, 'Noüy' and 'Nouÿ'.), was an architect who was appointed by the Romanian king Carol I for the restoration of a number of Romanian monuments, especially the Curtea de Argeș Cathedral. His mother, Hermine Lecomte du Noüy (1854 – 1915), wrote many novels, one of which, Amitié amoureuse, was translated into 16 languages and ran for 600 editions in France. His paternal uncle was the celebrated painter Jean-Jules-Antoine Lecomte du Nouÿ (1842 – 1923).

Educated in Paris, du Noüy obtained the degrees of LL.B., Ph.B., Sc.B., Ph.D., and Sc.D.

In 1925 he married Mary Bishop Harriman (1891 – 1974), granddaughter of American businessman Oliver Harriman. In 1943, fleeing World War II, they moved to New York City, where Lecomte du Noüy died in 1947 after a short illness. After her husband's death Mary stayed in Paris until her death in 1974. Her body was brought back to the United States to rest beside her husband in Woodlawn Cemetery in the Bronx, New York.

== Career ==
He was an associate member of the Rockefeller Institute working in Alexis Carrel's lab from 1920 through 1928, head for 10 years of the biophysics division of the Pasteur Institute, and the author of some 200 published papers.

He invented a tensiometer, a scientific apparatus that used his du Noüy ring method to measure the surface tension of liquids.

Du Noüy believed that mankind should have confidence in science, but be aware that we know less about the material world than is commonly believed.

== Telefinalism ==
Du Noüy converted from agnosticism to Christianity. He supported a theistic and teleological interpretation of evolution. In his book Human Destiny he wrote that biological evolution continues to a spiritual and moral plane. Du Noüy met Pierre Teilhard de Chardin who shared similar interests in evolution and spirituality.

Du Noüy developed his own hypothesis of orthogenesis known as "telefinalism". According to Du Noüy evolution could not occur by chance alone and that on an average since "the beginning of the world it has followed an ascending path, always oriented in the same direction." He accepted naturalistic evolutionary mechanisms such as mutation and natural selection but believed science could not explain all evolutionary phenomena or the origin of life. According to his telefinalist hypothesis a transcendent cause which he equated with God is directing the evolutionary process.

His "telefinalist" hypothesis was criticized by Carl Hempel, Leo Koch and George Gaylord Simpson as nonscientific.

== Publications ==
- Between Knowing and Believing (1967)
- The Road to Reason (1948)
- Human Destiny (1947)
- Biological Time (1937)
- An Interfacial Tensiometer for Universal Use (1925). The Journal of General Physiology. Volume 7, issue 5, pp. 625–633

== Quotes ==
If telefinalism, by postulating the intervention of an Idea, a Will, a supreme Intelligence, throws a little light on the combined transformations leading through an uninterrupted line to Man, it seems impossible not to see in the particular transformations limited to the species something more than the simple play of physico-chemical forces and chance. Human Destiny, p. 97

== See also ==
- Du Noüy ring method
