= Hermine Lecomte du Noüy =

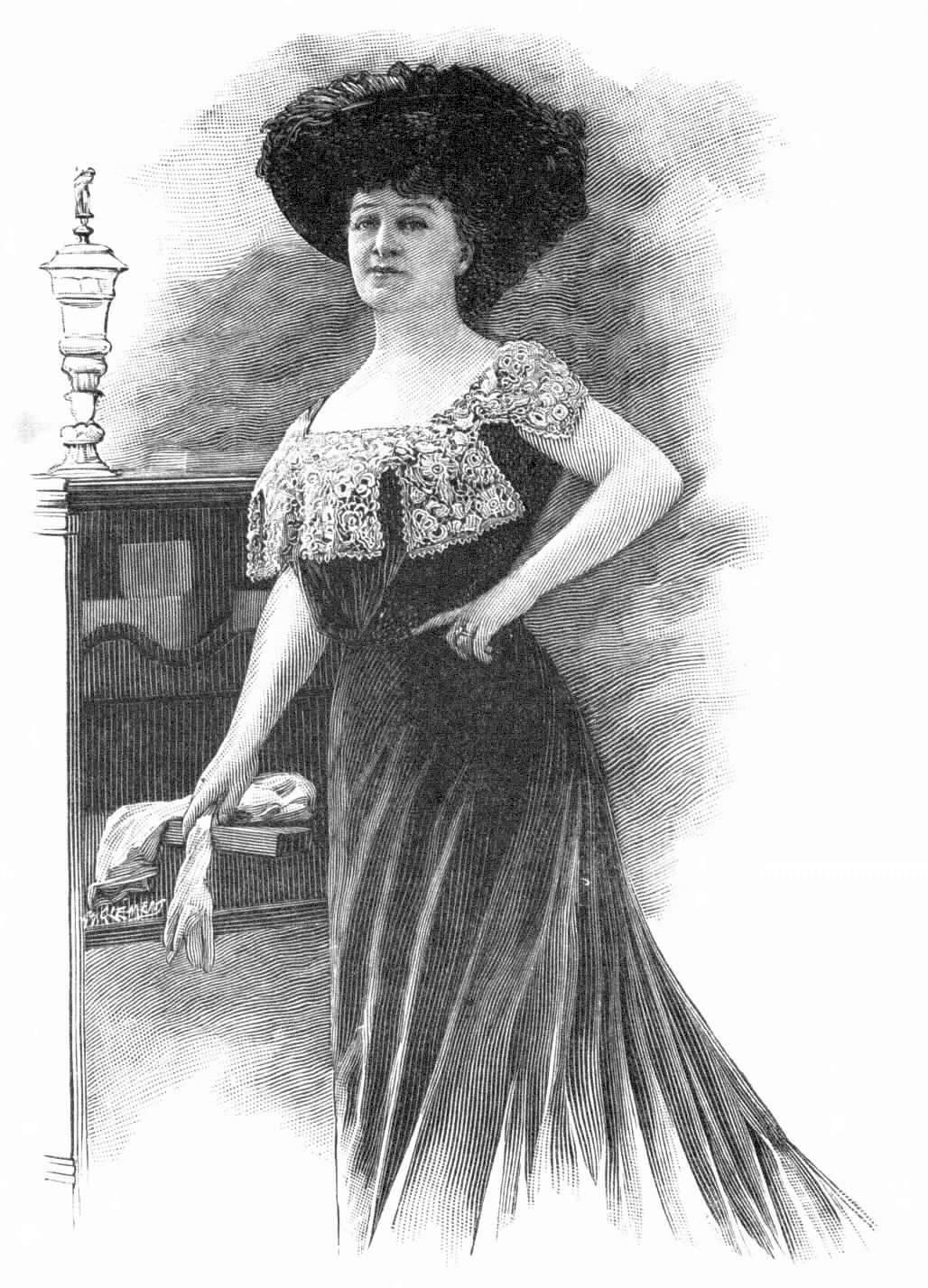
- Hermine Lecomte du Nouÿ in 1911
- Born: Hermine-Augustine-Eugénie Oudinot; 10 March 1854; Paris, France
- Died: 18 June 1915 (aged 61); Paris, France
- Occupations: novelist; playwright
- Spouse: André Lecomte du Noüy
- Children: Pierre Lecomte du Noüy
- Writing career
- Pen name: Pierre Guérande

Signature
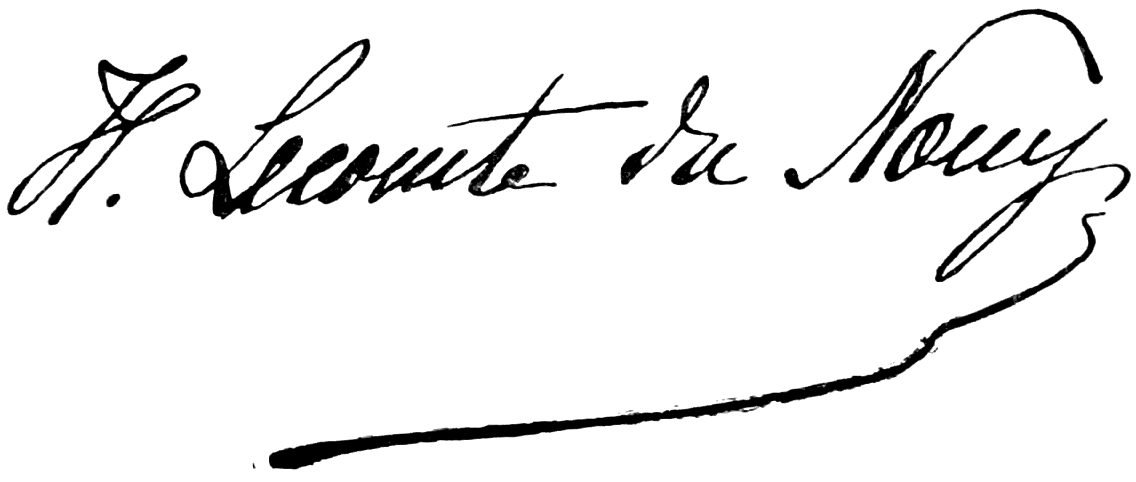

Hermine Lecomte du Noüy (née Oudinot; pen names, L'auteur d'Amitié amoureuse and Pierre Guérande; Paris, 1854 - Paris, 1915) was a French writer.

== Early life ==
Hermine-Augustine-Eugénie Oudinot was born on 10 March 1854 in Paris. Her father was the stained glass painter Eugène-Stanislas Oudinot. Her sister, Camille Oudinot, was a novelist and playwright.

== Career ==
Incertidumbre (1902)

Lecomte made her literary debut in 1896, with the novel Amitié amoureuse (Love friendship), which was a success. She signed much of her other works with the signature "L'auteur d'Amitié amoureuse" (author of Love friendship) and also used the pseudonym "Pierre Guérande". Her other works include titles such as L'Amour est un péché (Love is a Sin), Désobéissance criminelle (Criminal Disobedience), and Le Doute plus fort que l'Amour (Doubt Stronger than Love) (1900). In collaboration with Maurice de Waleffe she was the author of the novel Mater dolorous (Mother of pain) (1901), Maudit soit l'amour (Cursed be love) (1901), and Hésitation sentimentale (Sentimental hesitation) (1901); with Henri Amic she wrote En regardant passer la vie (Watching life go by) (1903), La Joie d'aimer (The Joy of Loving) (1904), Les serments ont des ailes (Oaths have wings) (1904), and Jours passés (Days gone by) (1908); with Jean de Fossendal, she was the author of L'amour guette (Love is lurking) (1908); and with B. Moyra of La Route interrompue (The Interrupted Road), a novel translated from English.

== Personal life ==
In his biography of Maupassant, Henri Troyat notes that Lecomte lived in Étretat in a house called "La Bicoque", next to that of Maupassant, and that he often visited her, but that there is no evidence of a more in-depth relationship. However, Troyat writes, "Maupassant would take such a place in her life that, much later, she would evoke their meeting in a novel published anonymously, Amitié amoureuse (Love friendship) and in a work of memories, En regarde passer la vi (Watching life go by). She later lived in her private mansion at 30 Boulevard Flandrin in the 16th arrondissement of Paris, which has since been destroyed.

In the 1870s, she married André Lecomte du Noüy, an architect in the service of the Romanian government and restorer of the church of Curtea de Argeș. Their son was Pierre Lecomte du Noüy.

Hermine Lecomte du Noüy died in her hometown on 18 June 1915.

== Selected works ==
- L'Erreur d'aimer (The Mistake of Loving) (1893), with preface by Marcel Prévost
- Steeple-chase, scènes de la vie mondaine en un acte (Steeplechase, scenes from worldly life in one act) (1896), play written with Suzanne Reichenberg
- Amitié amoureuse (Amorous Friendship) Calmann-Lévy, 1896
- Désobéissance criminelle (Criminal Disobedience), Hachette, 1899
- L'amour est mon péché (Love is my sin), Calmann-Lévy, 1899
- Le Doute plus fort que l'amour (Doubt stronger than love), Calmann-Lévy, 1900
- Mater dolorosa (Mother of pain), Calmann-Lévy, 1901, with Maurice de Waleffe
- Maudit soit l'amour (Cursed be love), Calmann-Lévy, 1901, with Maurice de Waleffe
- Hésitation sentimentale (Sentimental hesitation), Calmann-Lévy, 1902
- En regardant passer la vie (Watching life go by), Paul Ollendorff, 1903, with Henri Amic
- La Joie d'aimer (The Joy of Loving), Calmann-Lévy, 1904, with Henri Amic
- Les serments ont des ailes (Oaths have wings), Calmann-Lévy, 1904, with Henri Amic
- Jours passés (Days gone by), 1908], with Henri Amic
- L'amour guette (Love is lurking), 1908, with Jean de Fossendal
- La Route interrompue (The Interrupted Road), Pierre Lafitte, 1910, translation in collaboration with B. Mayra
