= Wilhelmy plate =

Device used to measure surface tension

Illustration of Wilhelmy plate method. The magnitude of the capillary force $F$ on the plate is proportional to the wetted perimeter, $l=2w+2d$, and to the surface tension $\gamma$ of the liquid-air interface.

A Wilhelmy plate is a thin plate that is used to measure equilibrium surface or interfacial tension at an air–liquid or liquid–liquid interface. In this method, the plate is oriented perpendicular to the interface, and the force exerted on it is measured. Based on the work of Ludwig Wilhelmy, this method finds wide use in the preparation and monitoring of Langmuir films.

== Detailed description ==
The Wilhelmy plate consists of a thin plate usually on the order of a few square centimeters in area. The plate is often made from filter paper, glass or platinum which may be roughened to ensure complete wetting. In fact, the results of the experiment do not depend on the material used, as long as the material is wetted by the liquid. The plate is cleaned thoroughly and attached to a balance with a thin metal wire. The force on the plate due to wetting is measured using a tensiometer or microbalance and used to calculate the surface tension ($\gamma$) using the Wilhelmy equation:

$$\gamma = \frac{F}{l\cos(\theta)}$$

where $l$ is the wetted perimeter ($2w + 2d$), $w$ is the plate width, $d$ is the plate thickness, and $\theta$ is the contact angle between the liquid phase and the plate. In practice the contact angle is rarely measured; instead, either literature values are used or complete wetting ($\theta=0$) is assumed.

In general, surface tension may be measured with high sensitivity using very thin plates ranging in thickness from 0.1 to 0.002 mm. The device is calibrated with pure liquids like water and ethanol. The buoyancy adjustment is minimized by utilizing a thin plate and dipping it as little as feasible. Wetting water on a platinum plate is accomplished by using commercially available platinum plates that have been roughened to improve wettability.

== Advantages and short brief ==
If complete wetting is assumed (contact angle = 0), no correction factors are required to calculate surface tensions when using the Wilhelmy plate, unlike for a du Noüy ring. In addition, because the plate is not moved during measurements, the Wilhelmy plate allows accurate determination of surface kinetics on a wide range of timescales, and it displays low operator variance. In a typical plate experiment, the plate is lowered to the surface being analyzed until a meniscus is formed, and then raised so that the bottom edge of the plate lies on the plane of the undisturbed surface. If measuring a buried interface, the second (less dense) phase is then added on top of the undisturbed primary (denser) phase in such a way as to not disturb the meniscus. The force at equilibrium can then be used to determine the absolute surface or interfacial tension. Due to a large wetted area of the plate, the measurement is less susceptible for measurement errors than when using a smaller probe. Also, the method has been described in several international measurement standards.

== See also ==
- Tensiometer (surface tension)
- du Noüy ring method
- Sessile drop technique
