= Jean-Jules-Antoine Lecomte du Nouÿ =

French painter (1842-1923)

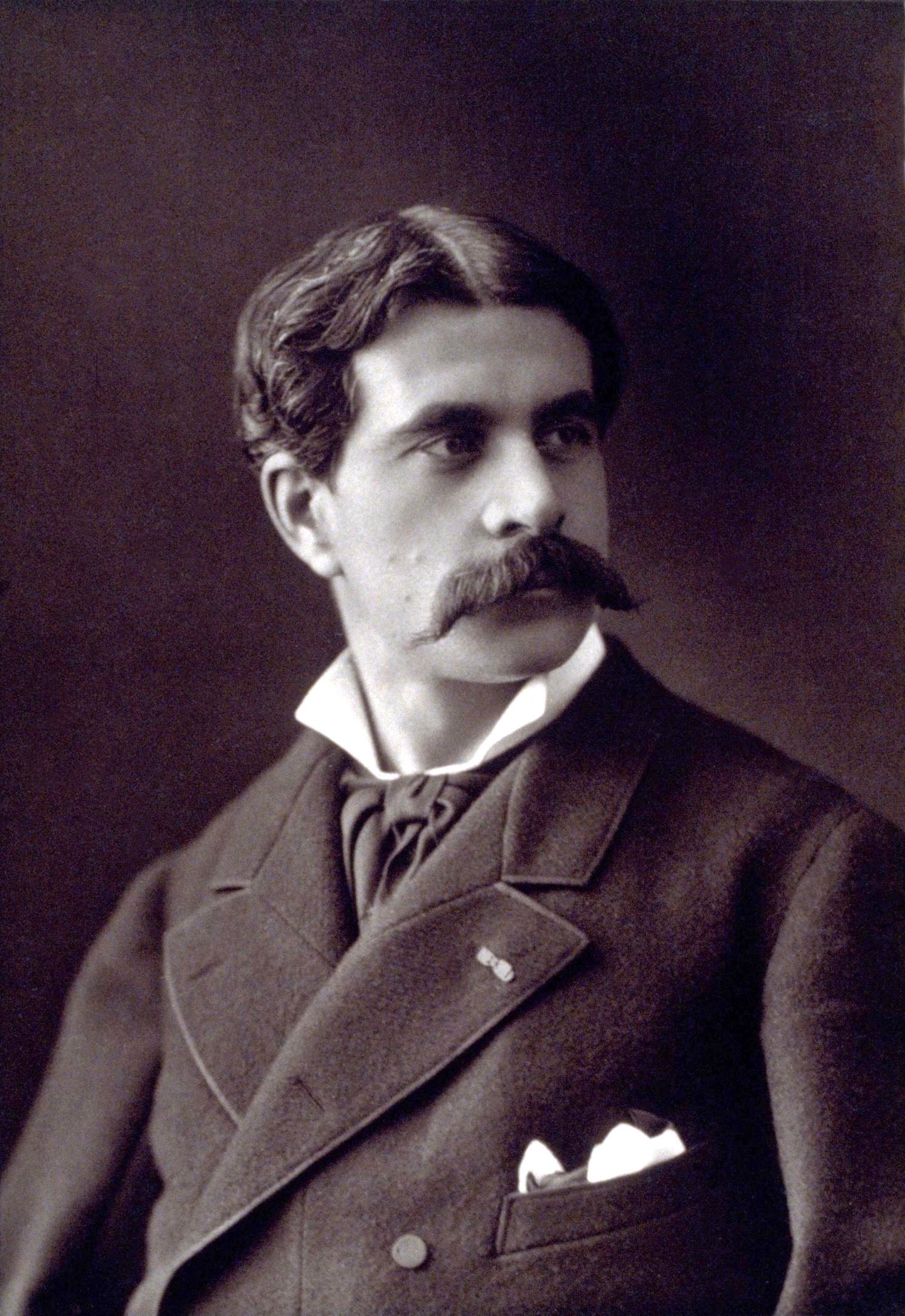
- Jean-Jules-Antoine Lecomte du Nouÿ, photograph by Nadar
- Born: 10 June 1842; Paris, Kingdom of France
- Died: 19 February 1923 (aged 80); Paris, French Third Republic
- Education: Atelier of Charles Gleyre
- Known for: Painter
- Movement: Orientalist; Realism

Jean-Jules-Antoine Lecomte du Nouÿ (10 June 1842 – 19 February 1923) was an Orientalist French painter and sculptor. He was strongly influenced by the works and teachings of Charles Gleyre and Jean-Léon Gérôme. Lecomte du Nouÿ found inspiration for his art through extensive travels to Greece, Turkey, Egypt, Romania and Italy. The thematic content of Lecomte du Nouÿ's work was mainly figural, but also spanned over a vast range of imagery throughout his career, including classical, historical and religious.

Lecomte du Nouÿ is known for remaining faithful to his detailed, realistic style throughout the extent of his career, despite the onset of the Impressionist, Fauvist and Constructivist artistic movements during his lifetime. His work is said to have contributed significantly to the establishment of an iconic repertoire representing the Orient in the nineteenth century. A Parisian street was named after him in 1932.

== Early life and education ==
Jean-Jules-Antoine was born on 10 June 1842 in Paris. Originally of a Piedmontese origin, his family had been settled in France since the fourteenth century and by the time of his birth had reached the status of nobility. Lecomte du Nouÿ showed a strong attachment to visual art from a young age and was reported to have painted portraits of his father and uncle by the age of 6. In 1861, at 19 years of age, the artistic talents of young Jean-Jules-Antoine Lecomte du Nouÿ prompted him to become a pupil at the atelier of Swiss artist, Charles Gleyre. Under Gleyre's guidance Jean-Jules-Antoine learned the significance of individualistic style and gained the foundations of creative visual presentation. Later, Lecomte du Nouy further perfected his knowledge of the artistic form under the mentorship of Jean-Léon Gérôme, who was a renowned painter of the Academicism movement. It was at this time that Jean-Jules-Antoine learned the precision required to depict la belle nature—a style of illustration that aims to create the most beautiful representations of the natural form. This later became one of the main techniques employed in Lecomte du Nouÿ's signature artwork.

== Maturity and Travels ==
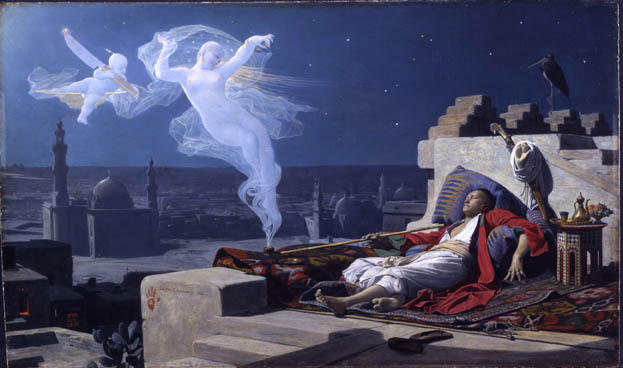
A Eunuch's Dream, 1874, Cleveland Museum of Art.

In 1865, Du Nouÿ accompanied fellow artist, Félix Auguste Clément, on his travels to Cairo, Egypt. It was after this voyage that the young Lecompte du Nouy sought to portray the opulence of the Orient. In later years, he continued his travels, visiting countries like Italy and Greece. Lecompte du Nouy found inspiration in all social, historical and literary facets of foreign culture.

== Artistic style ==
The Orientalist style is largely characterized by its content, but also by its subdued realism and precision allotted towards depicting the human form. The latter is a prominent characteristic of the 19th century methods upheld by the Académie des Beaux-Arts. Du Nouÿ was a prominent figure within the sphere of academic art and thereby adhered to a rule-based artistic style of well-developed skill and formal composition. The artistic composition of his paintings was often complemented by the use of half-light, which added certain dramatic and melancholic qualities to his work. To this day some, like Alan Braddock, consider Du Nouÿ to have been decidedly modern for his time, because his work directly and indirectly broached some of the key issues of his day, albeit from a decidedly conservative perspective: colonialism, international trade, gender, religion, and history.

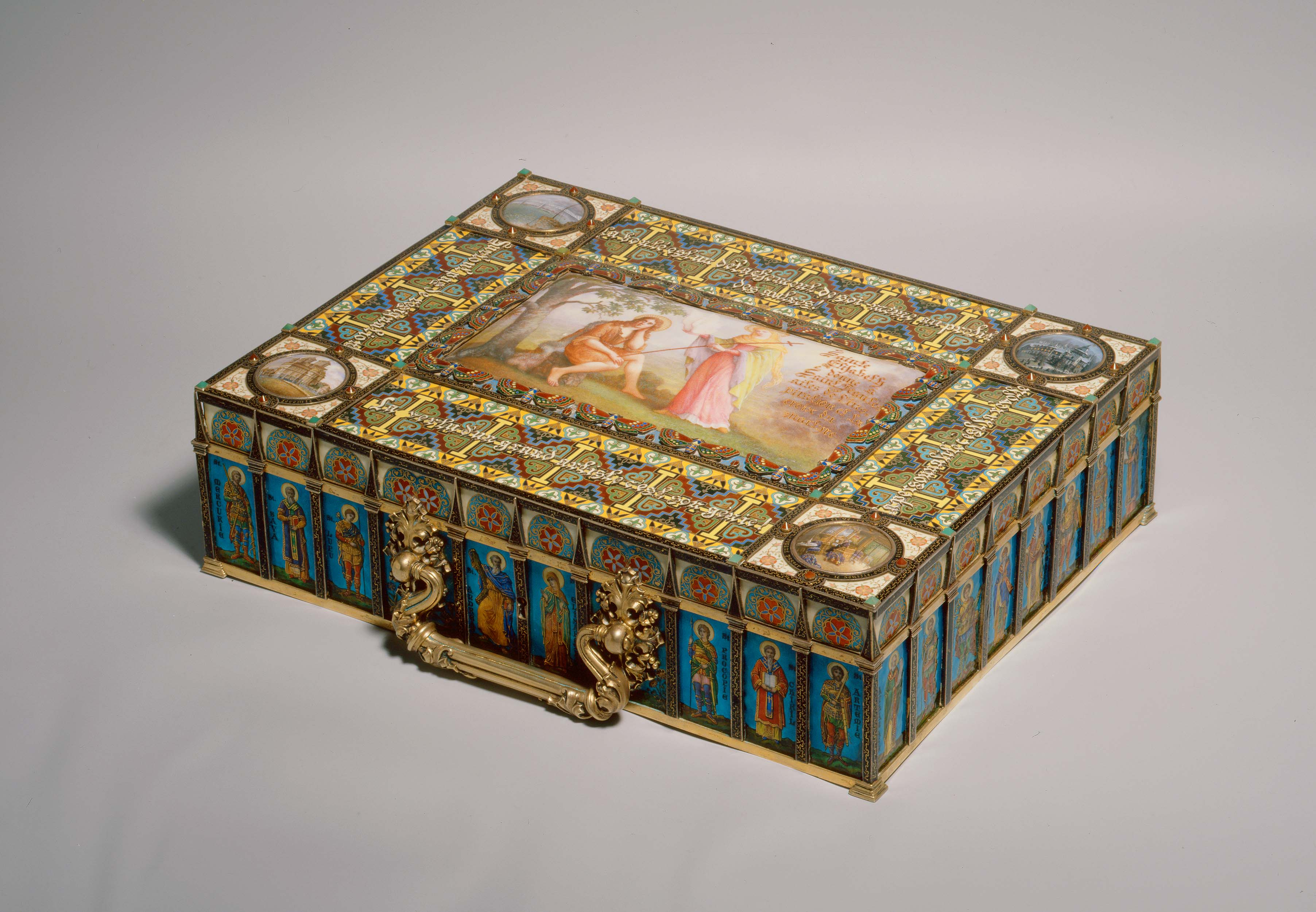
Decorated casket commissioned as a gift for Du Nouÿ by Queen Elisabeth of Romania

== Later life and death ==
Du Nouÿ spent most of the later years of his life in Romania. There he painted primarily the royal family and their subjects. However, he returned to Paris right before his death on 19 February 1923.

== Selected paintings ==
- 1864 : Le Guet-à-pens
- 1866 : Invocation de Neptune
- 1869 : Le souper de Beaucaire
- 1870 : Démosthène s'exerçant à la parole
- 1871 : Chrétiennes au tombeau de la Vierge
- 1872 : Les porteurs de mauvaises nouvelles
- 1874 : Un rêve d'eunuque
- 1875 : Judith
- 1878 : Adolphe Crémieux
- 1882 : The Reading of the Bible by the Rabbis (A Souvenir of Morocco)
- 1884 : Le Marabout prophète
- 1888 : L'esclave blanche (The White Slave)
- 1889 : Le samedi au quartier juif
- 1890 : Le dimanche à Venise
- 1899 : Portrait du Roi et de la Reine de Roumanie
- 1902 : Mademoiselle de Maupin
- 1904 : La Sorcière
- 1904 : Rêve d'Orient
- 1905 : La Péri et le Poète
- 1913 : La dernière ronde
- 1919 : Etude pour la Victoire

== Paris ==
The rue Lecomte du Nouÿ runs west from the boulevard Murat in arrondissement 16.

== Gallery ==
Paintings by Lecomte du Nouÿ

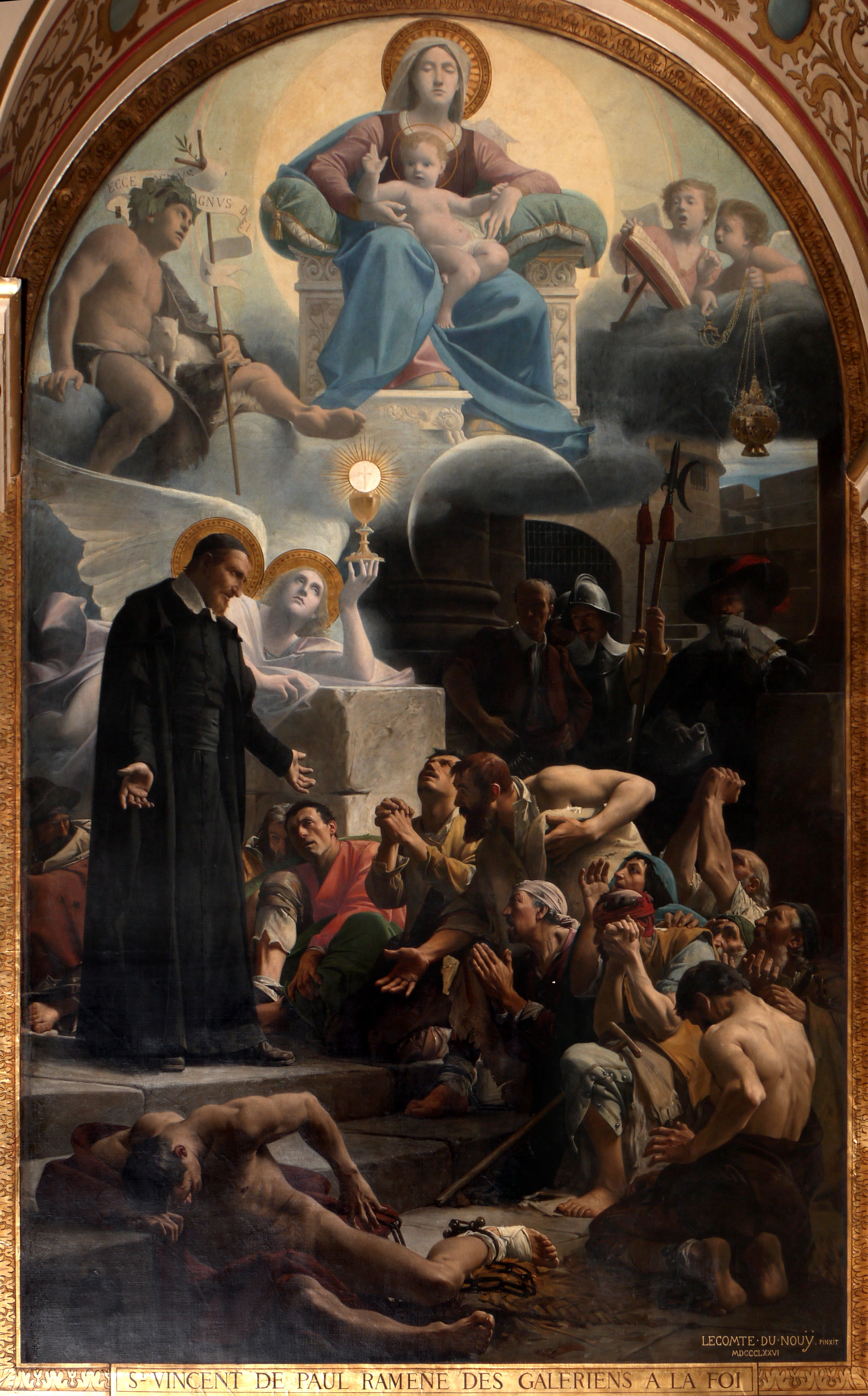
Saint Vincent de Paul bringing galley slaves to the faith, 1876, Sainte-Trinité, Paris.

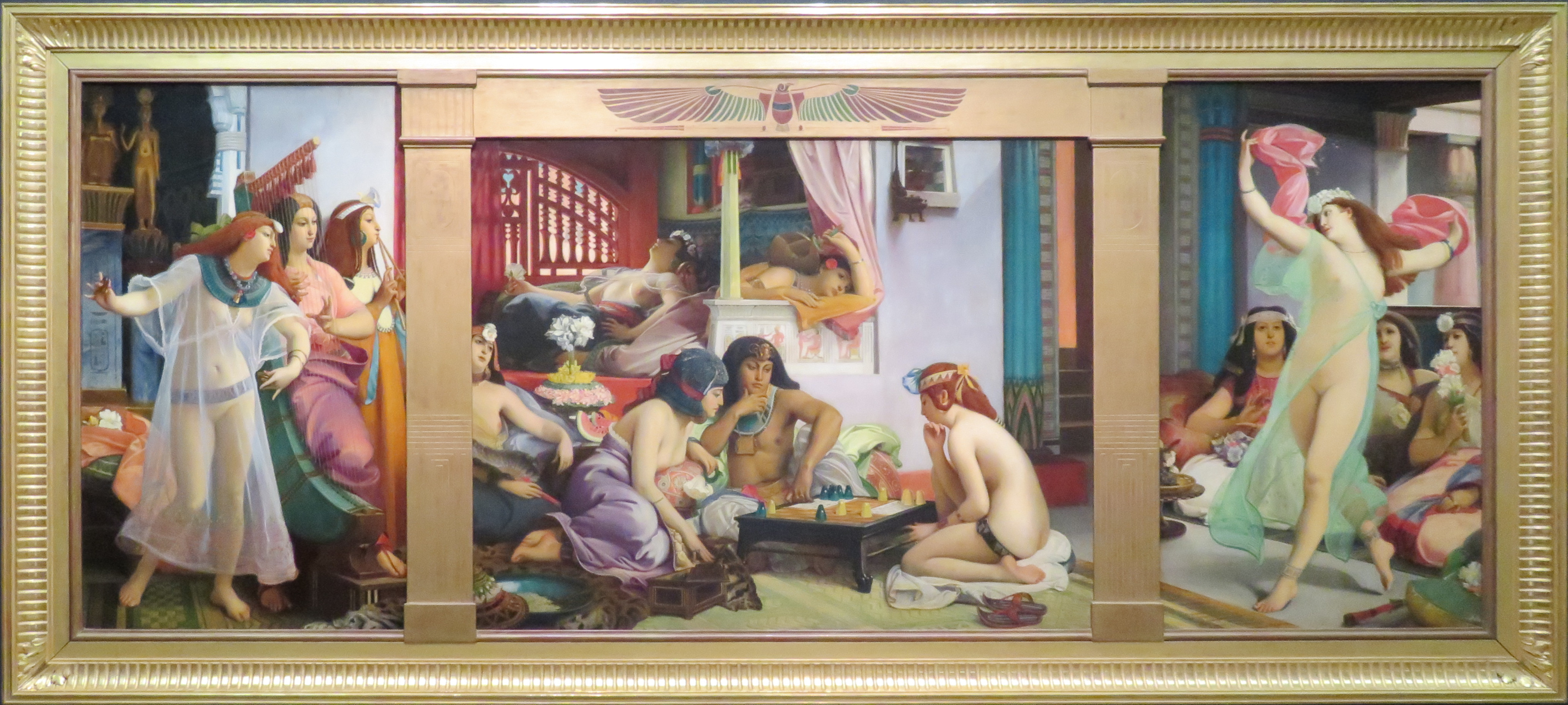
Ramses in his harem, 1887, Paris, musée d'Orsay.

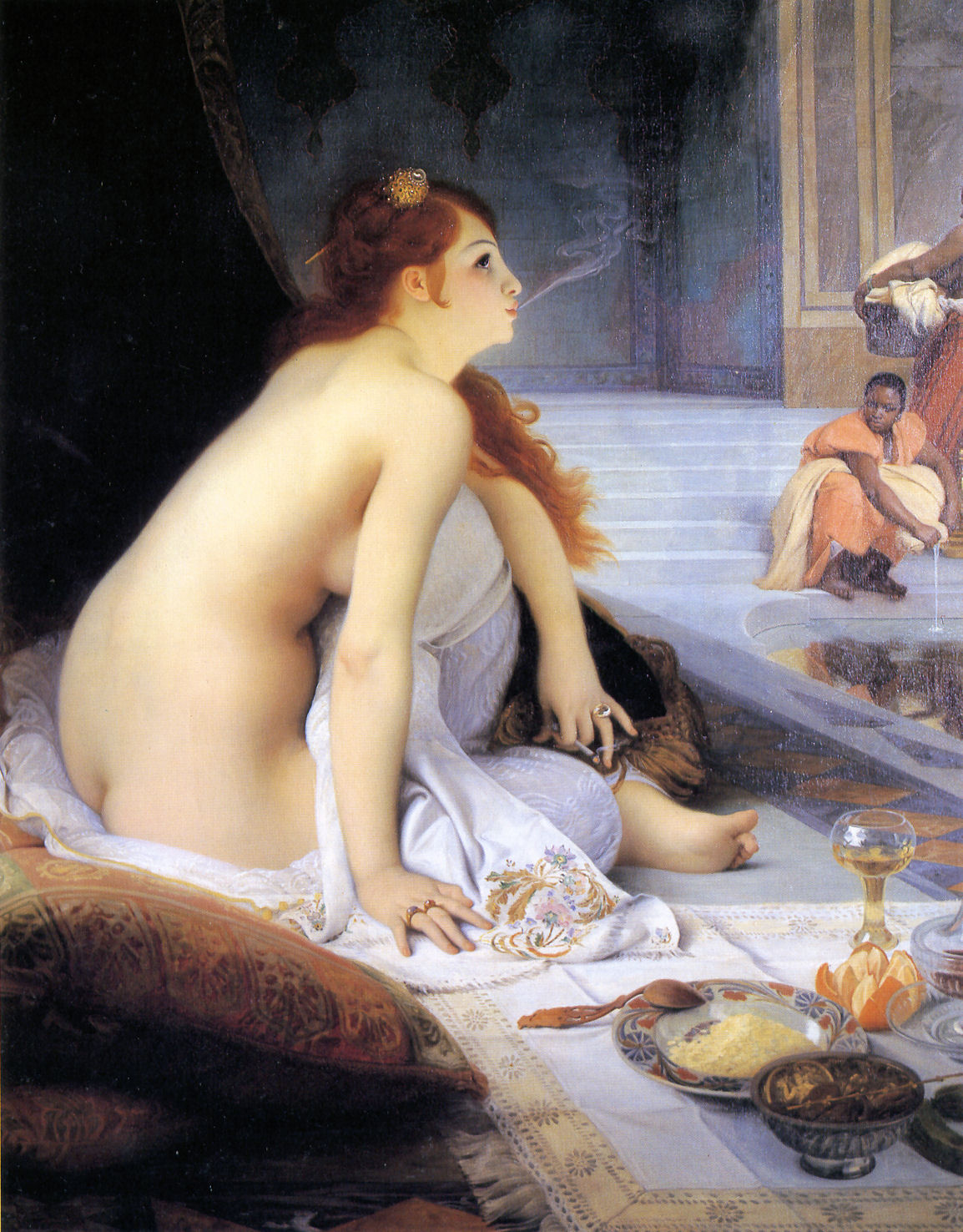
The White Slave, 1888, Musée des Beaux-Arts de Nantes.

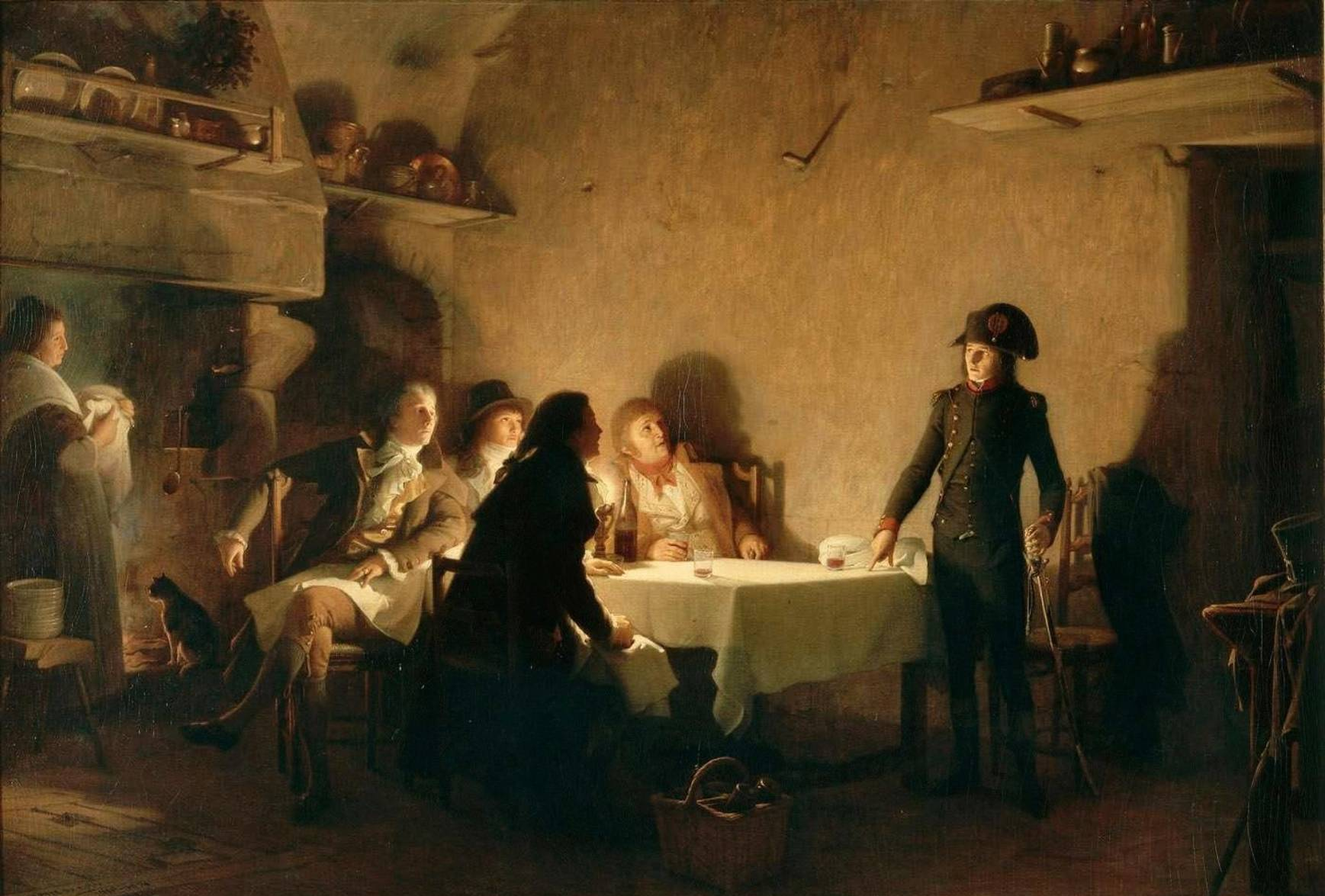
The Supper of Beaucaire, 28th July 1793, 1869–1894, Château de Malmaison.

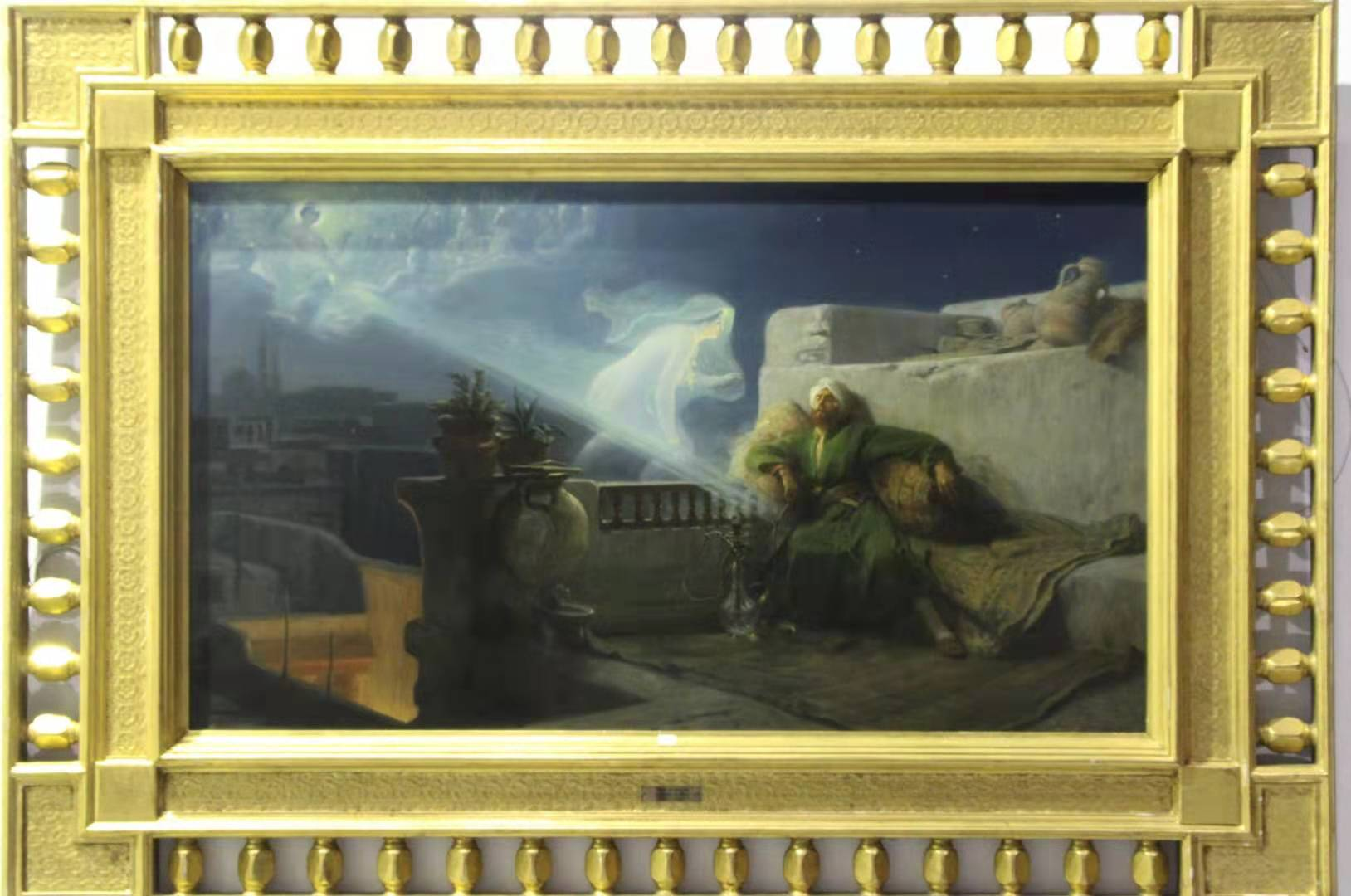

== Literature ==
- Roger Diederen, "From Homer to the harem: The art of Jean Lecomte du Nouÿ" (New York: Dahesh Museum of Art, 2004) incl. catalogue raisonné.
