= Du Noüy ring method =

Method of measuring a liquid's surface tension

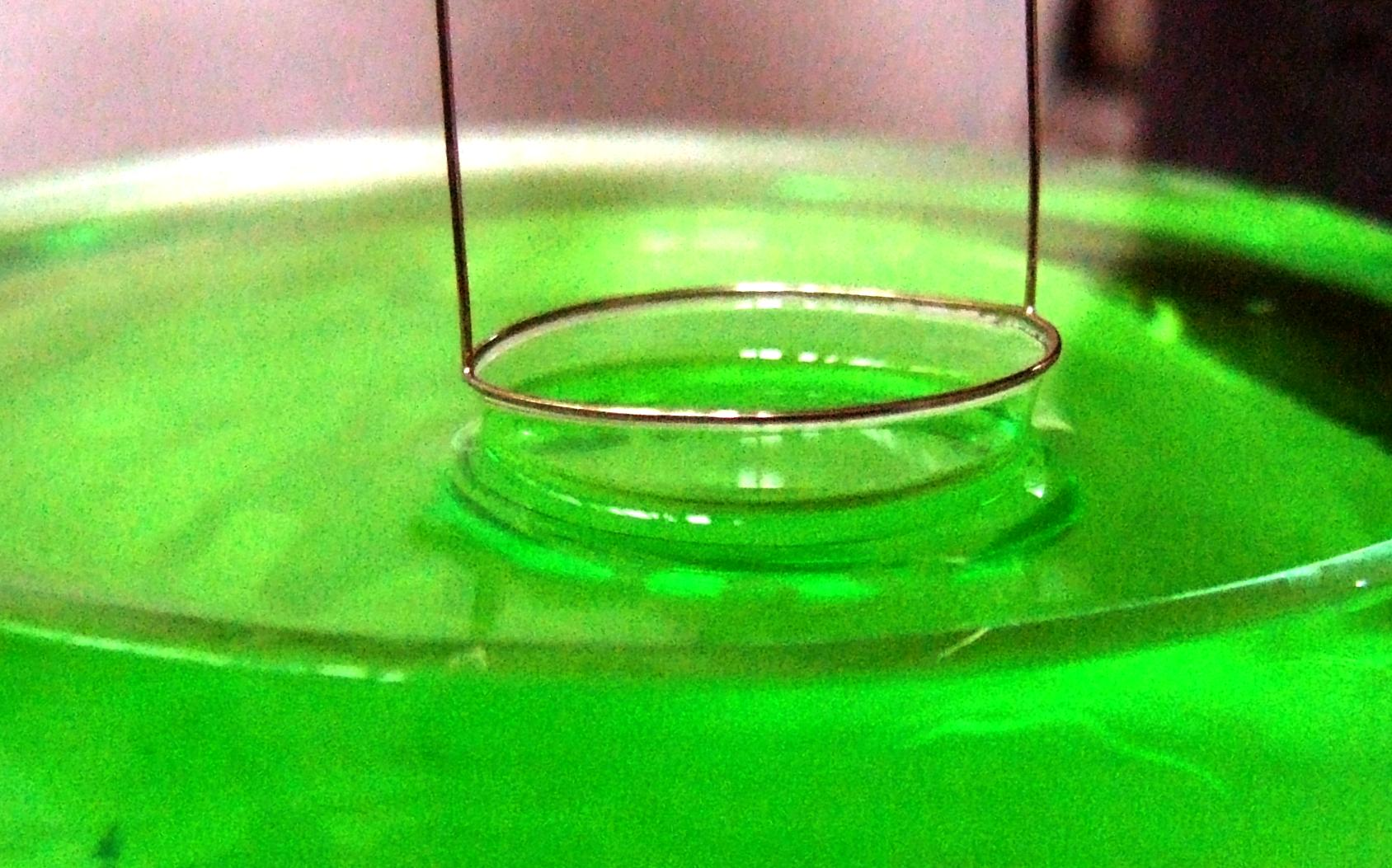
Close up of the ring drawn out of the liquid

In surface science, the du Noüy ring method is a technique for measuring the surface tension of a liquid. This technique was proposed by Pierre Lecomte du Noüy in 1925. The measurement is performed with a force tensiometer, which typically uses an electrobalance to measure the excess force caused by the liquid being pulled up and automatically calculates and displays the surface tension corresponding to the force. Earlier, torsion wire balances were commonly used.

== Description ==
The method involves slowly lifting a ring, often made of platinum, from the surface of a liquid. The force, F, required to raise the ring from the liquid's surface is measured and related to the liquid's surface tension γ:

$$F = w_\text{ring} + 2\pi \cdot (r_\text{i} + r_\text{a}) \cdot \gamma,$$

where r_{i} is the radius of the inner ring of the liquid film pulled, and r_{a} is the radius of the outer ring of the liquid film. w_{ring} is the weight of the ring minus the buoyant force due to the part of the ring below the liquid surface.

When the ring's thickness is much smaller than its diameter, this equation can be simplified to

$$F = w_\text{ring} + 4\pi R \gamma,$$

where R is the average of the inner and outer radius of the ring, i.e. $(r_\text{i} + r_\text{a})/2.$

The maximum force is used for the calculations, and empirically determined correction factors are required to remove the effect caused by the finite diameter of the ring:

$$F = w_\text{ring} + 4\pi R \gamma f,$$

with f being the correction factor.

== Correction factors ==
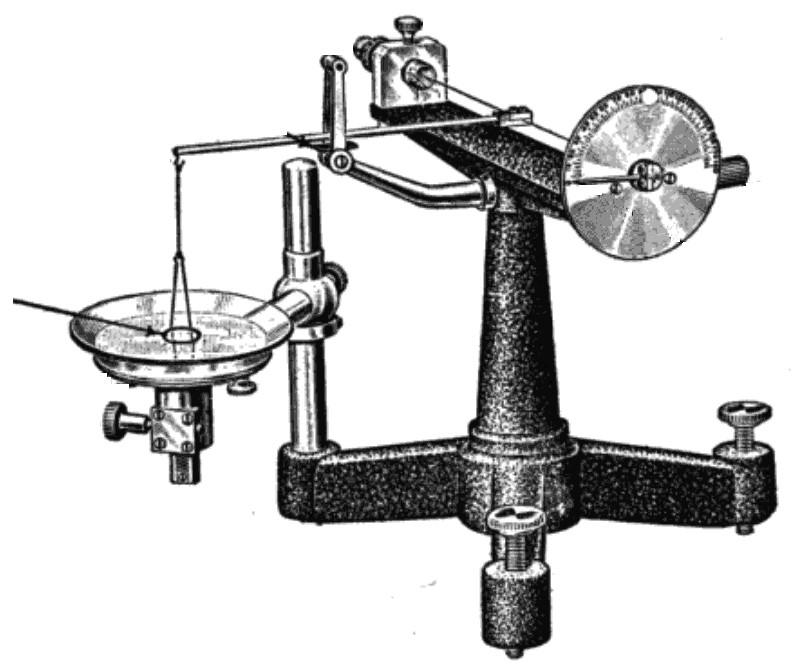
A classical torsion wire-based du Noüy ring tensiometer. The arrow on the left points to the ring itself.

The most common correction factors include Zuidema–Waters correction factors (for liquids with low interfacial tension), Huh–Mason correction factors (which cover a wider range than Zuidema–Waters), and Harkins–Jordan correction factors (more precise than Huh–Mason, while still covering the most widely used liquids).

The surface tension and correction factors are expressed by

$$\gamma = \frac{F}{4 \pi R} f,$$

where γ is surface tension, R is the average radius of the ring, and f is correction factor.

=== Zuidema–Waters correction factors ===
H. H. Zuidema and George W. Waters introduced the following correction factor in 1961:

$$(f - a)^2 = \frac{4b}{\pi ^2} \frac{1}{R^2} \frac{\gamma_\text{measured}}{\rho_\text{lower} - \rho_\text{upper}} + C,$$

where

F = maximum pull of rings [dyn/cm],
ρ = density of the lower and upper phases,
$$C = 0.04534 - 1.679 \frac{r}{R},$$
a = 0.7250,
b = 0.0009075 [s^{2}⋅cm^{−1}],
r = Du Noüy wire radius,
R = Du Noüy ring radius.

=== Huh–Mason correction factors ===
C. Huh and S. G. Mason described the correction factors as a function of $\tfrac{R}{r}$ and $\tfrac{R^3}{V}.$ See the references.

=== Harkins–Jordan correction factors ===
William Draper Harkins and Hubert F. Jordan tabulated the correction factors as a function of $R/r$ and $R^3/V$.

== See also ==
- Sessile drop technique
- Wilhelmy plate
