= Contact angle =

Angle between a liquid–vapor interface and a solid surface

Schematic of a liquid drop showing the quantities in the Young equation.

The contact angle (symbol θ_{C}) is the angle between a liquid surface and a solid surface where they meet. More specifically, it is the angle between the surface tangent on the liquid–vapor interface and the tangent on the solid–liquid interface at their intersection. It quantifies the wettability of a solid surface by a liquid via the Young equation.

A given system of solid, liquid, and vapor at a given temperature and pressure has a unique equilibrium contact angle. However, in practice a dynamic phenomenon of contact angle hysteresis is often observed, ranging from the advancing (maximal) contact angle to the receding (minimal) contact angle. The equilibrium contact is within those values, and can be calculated from them. The equilibrium contact angle reflects the relative strength of the liquid, solid, and vapour molecular interaction.

The contact angle depends upon the medium above the free surface of the liquid, and the nature of the liquid and solid in contact. It is independent of the inclination of solid to the liquid surface. It changes with surface tension and hence with the temperature and purity of the liquid.

== Molecular interpretation of water contact angles ==
A recent molecular energetic perspective explains the classical 90° threshold by quantifying the ability of a system to compensate for hydrogen-bond defects it induces in its hydration layer. According to this approach, if the energetic compensation is less favorable than the defect cost in bulk water—estimated around −6 kJ/mol, known as the Defect Interaction Threshold (DIT)—the system exhibits hydrophobic behavior, consistent with contact angles exceeding 90°. This provides a non-arbitrary molecular basis for the macroscopic contact angle criterion and complements classical Young–Dupré interpretations. This framework was later extended to macroscopic wetting by defining a molecular wetting coefficient, $\omega_m$, normalized by the DIT. It was shown that contact angles across chemically diverse surfaces collapse onto a single universal master curve when plotted against $\omega_m$, with $\cos \theta \approx \omega_m$, and that the 90° threshold corresponds to $\omega_m = 0$.

== See also ==
- Wetting – general description of how liquids spread on surfaces
- Hydrophobe – molecular definition of hydrophobicity tied to contact angle thresholds

== Thermodynamics ==
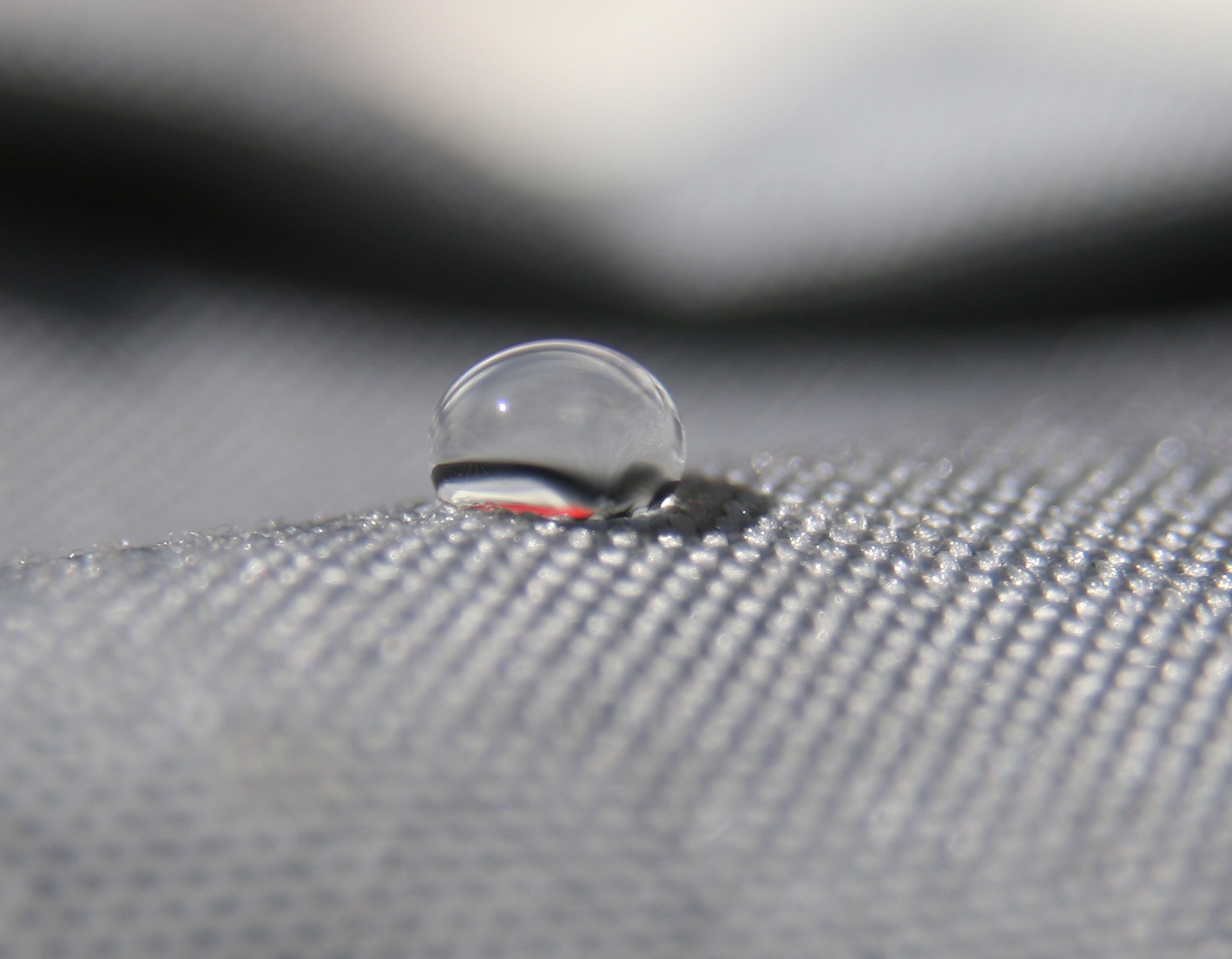
Cloth, treated to be hydrophobic, shows a high contact angle.

The theoretical description of contact angle arises from the consideration of a thermodynamic equilibrium between the three phases: the liquid phase (L), the solid phase (S), and the gas or vapor phase (G) (which could be a mixture of ambient atmosphere and an equilibrium concentration of the liquid vapor). (The "gaseous" phase could be replaced by another immiscible liquid phase.) If the solid–vapor interfacial energy is denoted by γ_{SG}, the solid–liquid interfacial energy by γ_{SL}, and the liquid–vapor interfacial energy (i.e. the surface tension) by γ_{LG}, then the equilibrium contact angle θ_{C} is determined from these quantities by the Young equation:
$$\gamma_{\rm SG} - \gamma_{\rm SL} - \gamma_{\rm LG} \cos \theta_{\rm C}=0 \,$$

The contact angle can also be related to the work of adhesion via the Young–Dupré equation:
$$\gamma_{\rm LG} (1 + \cos \theta_{\rm C} )= \Delta W_{\rm SLG} \,$$

where $\Delta W_{\rm SLG}$ is the solid – liquid adhesion energy per unit area when in the medium G.

=== Modified Young’s equation ===
The earliest study on the relationship between contact angle and surface tensions for sessile droplets on flat surfaces was reported by Thomas Young in 1805. A century later Gibbs proposed a modification to Young's equation to account for the volumetric dependence of the contact angle. Gibbs postulated the existence of a line tension, which acts at the three-phase boundary and accounts for the excess energy at the confluence of the solid-liquid-gas phase interface, and is given as:

$$\cos\theta = \frac{\gamma_{\rm SG}-\gamma_{\rm SL}}{\gamma_{\rm LG}} + \frac{\kappa}{\gamma_{\rm LG}} \frac{1}{a}$$

where κ is the line tension in Newtons and a is the droplet radius in meters. Although experimental data validates an affine relationship between the cosine of the contact angle and the inverse line radius, it does not account for the correct sign of κ and overestimates its value by several orders of magnitude.

=== Contact angle prediction while accounting for line tension and Laplace pressure ===
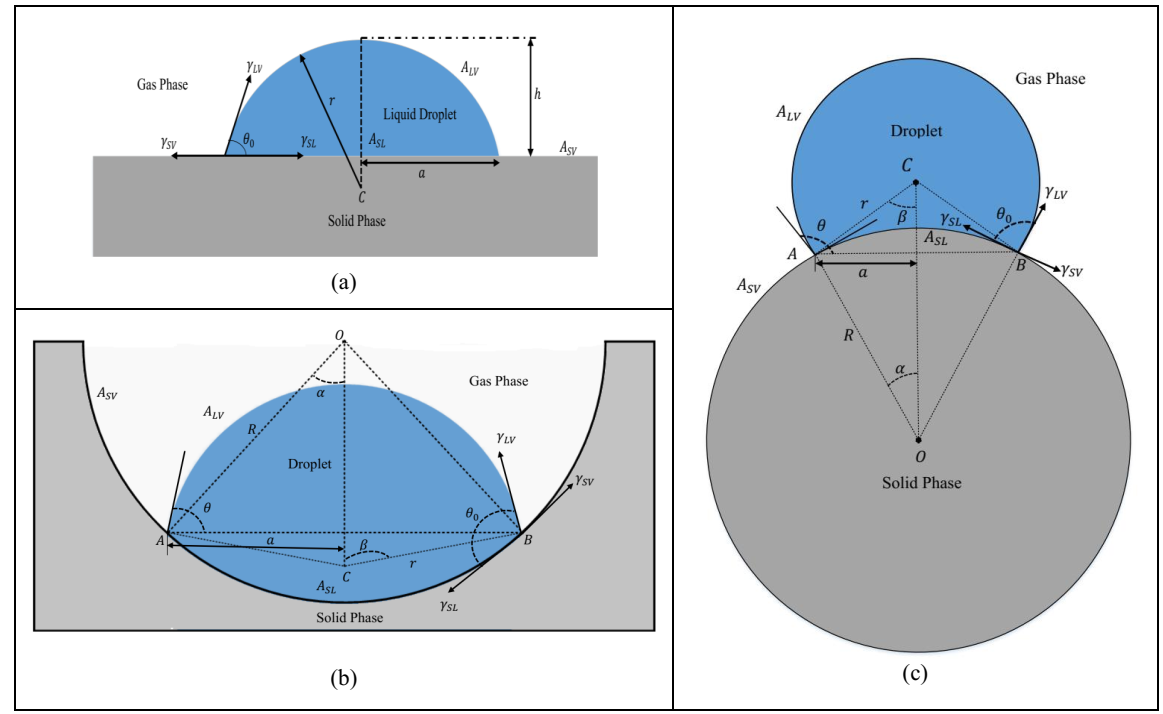
Schematic Diagrams for droplets on flat (a) concave (b) and convex (c) surfaces

With improvements in measuring techniques such as atomic force microscopy, confocal microscopy, and scanning electron microscope, researchers were able to produce and image droplets at ever smaller scales. With the reduction in droplet size came new experimental observations of wetting. These observations confirmed that the modified Young's equation does not hold at the micro-nano scales. Jasper proposed that including a V dP term in the variation of the free energy may be the key to solving the contact angle problem at such small scales. Given that the variation in free energy is zero at equilibrium:

$$0= \frac{dA_{\rm LG}}{dA_{\rm SL}} + \frac{\gamma_{\rm SL} - \gamma_{\rm SG}}{\gamma_{\rm LG}} - \frac{\kappa}{\gamma_{\rm LG}}\frac{dL}{dA_{\rm SL}} - \frac{V}{\gamma_{\rm LG}} \frac{dP}{dA_{\rm SL}}$$

The variation in the pressure at the free liquid-vapor boundary is due to Laplace pressure, which is proportional to the mean curvature. Solving the above equation for both convex and concave surfaces yields:

$$\cos(\theta\mp\alpha) = A + B\,\frac{\cos\alpha}{a} \pm C\sin(\theta \mp \alpha)(1 + \cos\theta)^2\biggl(\frac{\sin\alpha\,(2 + \cos\alpha)}{(1 + \cos\alpha)^2} \mp \frac{\sin\theta\,(2 + \cos\theta)}{(1 + \cos\theta)^2}\biggr)$$

where
$$A = \frac{\gamma_{\rm SG} - \gamma_{\rm SL}}{\gamma_{\rm LG}}, \quad B = \frac{\kappa}{\gamma_{\rm LG}}, \quad C = \frac{\gamma}{3\gamma_{\rm LG}}.$$

This equation relates the contact angle, a geometric property of a sessile droplet to the bulk thermodynamics, the energy at the three phase contact boundary, and the mean curvature of the droplet. For the special case of a sessile droplet on a flat surface (α = 0):

$$\cos\theta = \frac{\gamma_{\rm SG}-\gamma_{\rm SL}}{\gamma_{\rm LG}} + \frac{\kappa}{\gamma_{\rm LG}} \frac{1}{a} -\frac{\gamma}{3\gamma_{\rm LG}}(2 + \cos\theta - 2\cos^2\theta - \cos^3\theta)$$

In the above equation, the first two terms are the modified Young's equation, while the third term is due to the Laplace pressure. This nonlinear equation correctly predicts the sign and magnitude of κ, the flattening of the contact angle at very small scales, and contact angle hysteresis.

=== Contact angle hysteresis ===
A given substrate-liquid-vapor combination yields a continuous range of contact angle values in practice. The maximum contact angle is referred to as the advancing contact angle and the minimum contact angle is referred to as the receding contact angle. The advancing and receding contact angles are measured from dynamic experiments where droplets or liquid bridges are in movement. In contrast, the equilibrium contact angle described by the Young-Laplace equation is measured from a static state. Static measurements yield values in-between the advancing and receding contact angle depending on deposition parameters (e.g. velocity, angle, and drop size) and drop history (e.g. evaporation from time of deposition). Contact angle hysteresis is defined as θ_{A} – θ_{R} although the term is also used to describe the expression cos θ_{R} – cos θ_{A}. The static, advancing, or receding contact angle can be used in place of the equilibrium contact angle depending on the application. The overall effect can be seen as closely analogous to static friction, i.e., a minimal amount of work per unit distance is required to move the contact line.

The advancing contact angle can be described as a measure of the liquid-solid cohesion while the receding contact angle is a measure of liquid-solid adhesion. The advancing and receding contact angles can be measured directly using different methods and can also be calculated from other wetting measurements such as force tensiometry (aka Wilhemy-Plate method).

Advancing and receding contact angles can be measured directly from the same measurement if drops are moved linearly on a surface. For example, a drop of liquid will adopt a given contact angle when static, but when the surface is tilted the drop will initially deform so that the contact area between the drop and surface remains constant. The "downhill" side of the drop will adopt a higher contact angle while the "uphill" side of the drop will adopt a lower contact angle. As the tilt angle increases the contact angles will continue to change but the contact area between the drop and surface will remain constant. At a given surface tilt angle, the advancing and receding contact angles will be met and the drop will move on the surface. In practice, the measurement can be influenced by shear forces and momentum if the tilt velocity is high. The measurement method can also be challenging in practice for systems with high (>30 degrees) or low (<10 degrees) contact angle hysteresis.

Advancing and receding contact angle measurements can be carried out by adding and removing liquid from a drop deposited on a surface. If a sufficiently small volume of liquid is added to a drop, the contact line will still be pinned, and the contact angle will increase. Similarly, if a small amount of liquid is removed from a drop, the contact angle will decrease.

The Young's equation assumes a homogeneous surface and does not account for surface texture or outside forces such as gravity. Real surfaces are not atomically smooth or chemically homogeneous so a drop will assume contact angle hysteresis. The equilibrium contact angle (θ_{C}) can be calculated from θ_{A} and θ_{R} as was shown theoretically by Tadmor and confirmed experimentally by Chibowski as,

$$\theta_{\rm c} = \arccos\left(\frac{r_{\rm A}\cos\theta_{\rm A} + r_{\rm R}\cos\theta_{\rm R}}{r_{\rm A}+r_{\rm R}}\right)$$

where

$$\begin{align}
r_{\rm A} &= \sqrt[3]{ \frac{\sin^3\theta_{\rm A}}{2-3\cos\theta_{\rm A} + \cos^3 \theta_{\rm A}} } \\[4pt]
r_{\rm R} &= \sqrt[3]{\frac{\sin^3\theta_{\rm R}}{2-3\cos\theta_{\rm R} + \cos^3 \theta_{\rm R}} }
\end{align}$$

Equations for the advancing and receding contact angles have been derived also based on a purely thermodynamic theory

On a surface that is rough or contaminated, there will also be contact angle hysteresis, but now the local equilibrium contact angle (the Young equation is now only locally valid) may vary from place to place on the surface. According to the Young–Dupré equation, this means that the adhesion energy varies locally – thus, the liquid has to overcome local energy barriers in order to wet the surface. One consequence of these barriers is contact angle hysteresis: the extent of wetting, and therefore the observed contact angle (averaged along the contact line), depends on whether the liquid is advancing or receding on the surface.

Because liquid advances over previously dry surface but recedes from previously wet surface, contact angle hysteresis can also arise if the solid has been altered due to its previous contact with the liquid (e.g., by a chemical reaction, or absorption). Such alterations, if slow, can also produce measurably time-dependent contact angles.

=== Effect of roughness to contact angles ===
Surface roughness has a strong effect on the contact angle and wettability of a surface. The effect of roughness depends on if the droplet will wet the surface grooves or if air pockets will be left between the droplet and the surface.

If the surface is wetted homogeneously, the droplet is in Wenzel state. In Wenzel state, adding surface roughness will enhance the wettability caused by the chemistry of the surface. The Wenzel correlation can be written as
$$\cos\theta_m = r\cos\theta_Y$$
where θ_{m} is the measured contact angle, θ_{Y} is the Young contact angle and r is the roughness ratio. The roughness ratio is defined as the ratio between the actual and projected solid surface area.

If the surface is wetted heterogeneously, the droplet is in Cassie-Baxter state. The most stable contact angle can be connected to the Young contact angle. The contact angles calculated from the Wenzel and Cassie-Baxter equations have been found to be good approximations of the most stable contact angles with real surfaces.

=== Dynamic contact angles ===
For liquid moving quickly over a surface, the contact angle can be altered from its value at rest. The advancing contact angle will increase with speed, and the receding contact angle will decrease. The discrepancies between static and dynamic contact angles are closely proportional to the capillary number, noted $Ca$.

== Contact angle curvature ==
On the basis of interfacial energies, the profile of a surface droplet or a liquid bridge between two surfaces can be described by the Young–Laplace equation. This equation is applicable for three-dimensional axisymmetric conditions and is highly non-linear. This is due to the mean curvature term which includes products of first- and second-order derivatives of the drop shape function $f(x,y)$:
$$\kappa_m = \frac{1}{2}\frac{(1+{f_x}^2)f_{yy}-2f_x f_y f_{xy} + (1+{f_y}^2)f_{xx}}{(1+{f_x}^2+{f_y}^2)^{3/2}}.$$

Solving this elliptic partial differential equation that governs the shape of a three-dimensional drop, in conjunction with appropriate boundary conditions, is complicated, and an alternate energy minimization approach to this is generally adopted. The shapes of three-dimensional sessile and pendant drops have been successfully predicted using this energy minimisation method.

== Typical contact angles ==
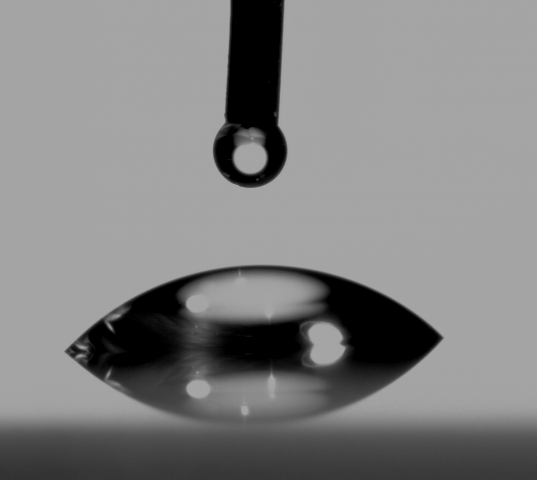
Image from a video contact angle device. Water drop on glass, with reflection below.

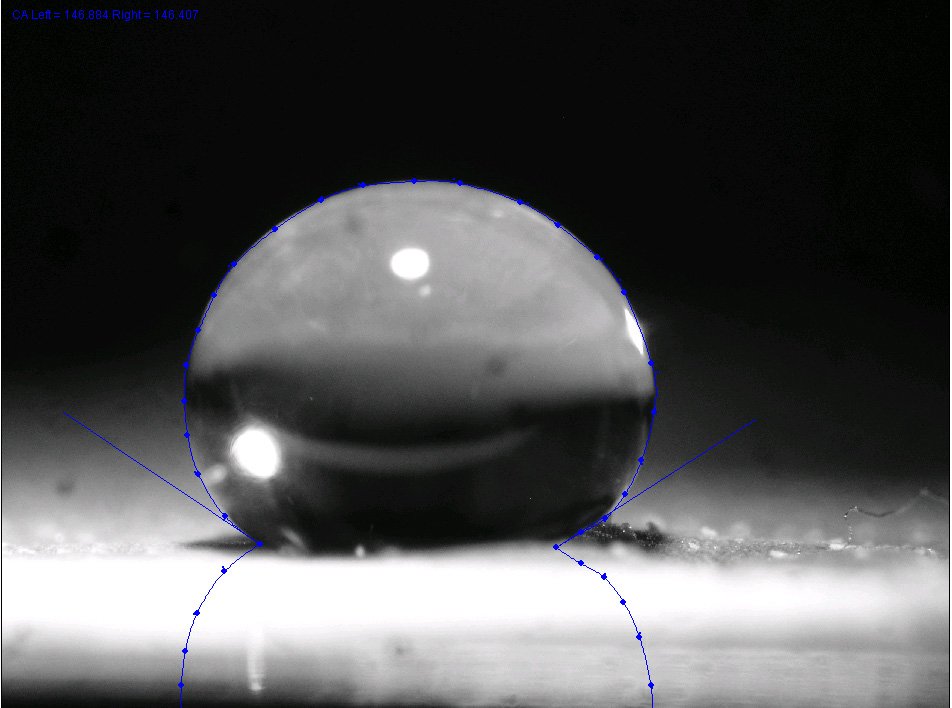
A water drop on a lotus leaf surface showing contact angles of approximately 147°.

Contact angles are extremely sensitive to contamination; values reproducible to better than a few degrees are generally only obtained under laboratory conditions with purified liquids and very clean solid surfaces. If the liquid molecules are strongly attracted to the solid molecules then the liquid drop will completely spread out on the solid surface, corresponding to a contact angle of 0°. This is often the case for water on bare metallic or ceramic surfaces, although the presence of an oxide layer or contaminants on the solid surface can significantly increase the contact angle. Generally, if the water contact angle is smaller than 90°, the solid surface is considered hydrophilic and if the water contact angle is larger than 90°, the solid surface is considered hydrophobic. Many polymers exhibit hydrophobic surfaces. Highly hydrophobic surfaces made of low surface energy (e.g. fluorinated) materials may have water contact angles as high as ≈ 120°. Some materials with highly rough surfaces may have a water contact angle even greater than 150°, due to the presence of air pockets under the liquid drop. These are called superhydrophobic surfaces.

If the contact angle is measured through the gas instead of through the liquid, then it should be replaced by 180° minus their given value. Contact angles are equally applicable to the interface of two liquids, though they are more commonly measured in solid products such as non-stick pans and waterproof fabrics.

== Control of contact angles ==
Control of the wetting contact angle can often be achieved through the deposition or incorporation of various organic and inorganic molecules onto the surface. This is often achieved through the use of specialty silane chemicals which can form a SAM (self-assembled monolayers) layer. With the proper selection of the organic molecules with varying molecular structures and amounts of hydrocarbon and/or perfluorinated terminations, the contact angle of the surface can tune. The deposition of these specialty silanes can be achieved in the gas phase through the use of a specialized vacuum ovens or liquid-phase process. Molecules that can bind more perfluorinated terminations to the surface can results in lowering the surface energy (high water contact angle).

Effect of surface fluorine on contact angle	Water contact angle
Precursor	on polished silicon (deg.)
Henicosyl-1,1,2,2-tetrahydrododecyldimethyltris(dimethylaminosilane)	118.0
Heptadecafluoro-1,1,2,2-tetrahydrodecyltrichlorosilane – (FDTS)	110.0
Nonafluoro-1,1,2,2-tetrahydrohexyltris(dimethylamino)silane	110.0
3,3,3,4,4,5,5,6,6-Nonafluorohexyltrichlorosilane	108.0
Tridecafluoro-1,1,2,2-tetrahydrooctyltrichlorosilane – (FOTS)	108.0
BIS(Tridecafluoro-1,1,2,2-tetrahydrooctyl)dimethylsiloxymethylchlorosilane	107.0
Dodecyltrichlorosilane – (DDTS)	105.0
Dimethyldichlorosilane – (DDMS)	103.0
10-Undecenyltrichlorosilane – (V11)	100.0
Pentafluorophenylpropyltrichlorosilane	90.0

== Measuring methods ==
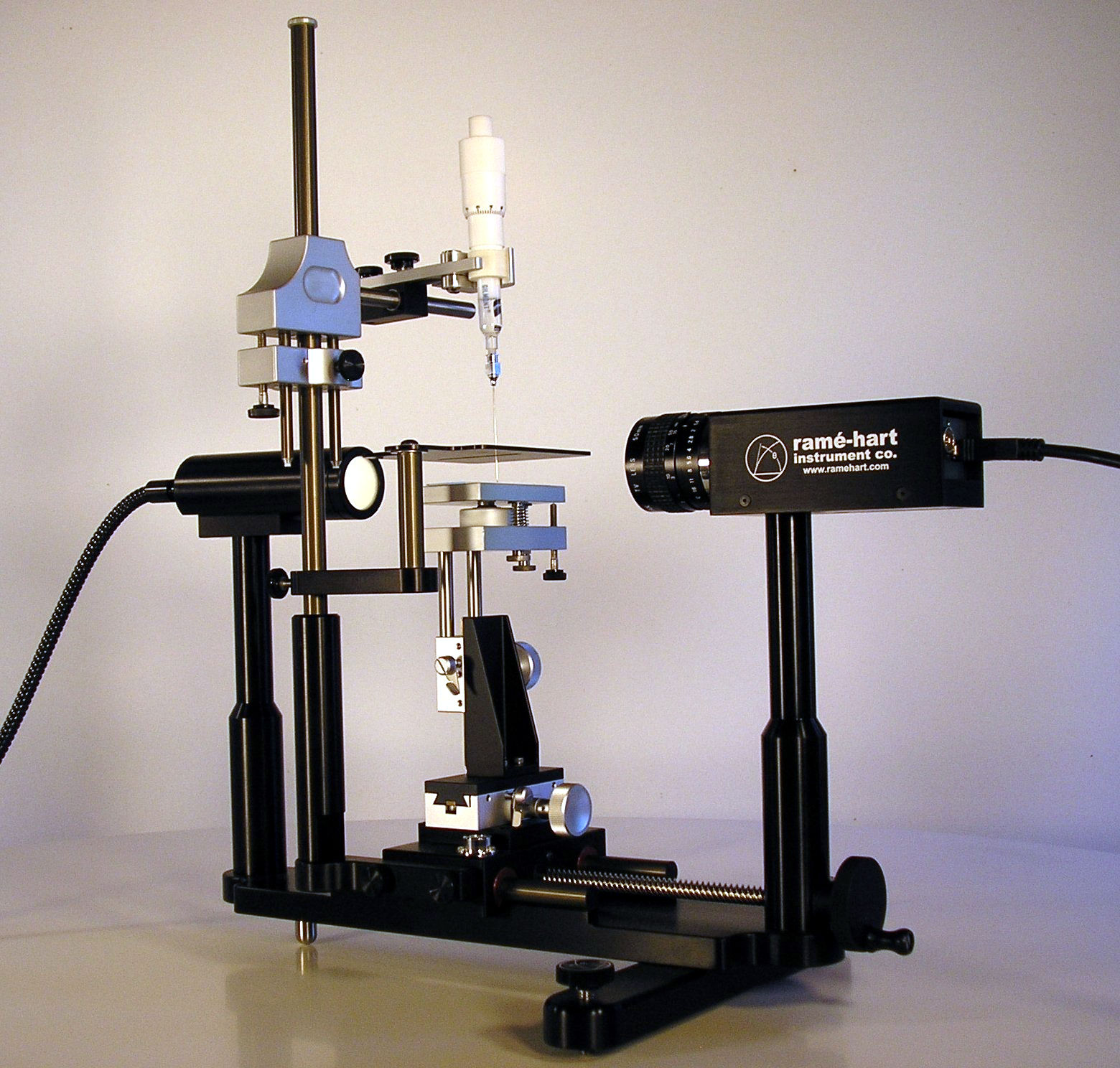
A contact angle goniometer is used to measure the contact angle.

Dynamic sessile drop method

=== The static sessile drop method ===
The sessile drop contact angle is measured by a contact angle goniometer using an optical subsystem to capture the profile of a pure liquid on a solid substrate. The angle formed between the liquid–solid interface and the liquid–vapor interface is the contact angle. Older systems used a microscope optical system with a back light. Current-generation systems employ high resolution cameras and software to capture and analyze the contact angle. Angles measured in such a way are often quite close to advancing contact angles. Equilibrium contact angles can be obtained through the application of well defined vibrations.

=== The pendant drop method ===
Measuring contact angles for pendant drops is much more complicated than for sessile drops due to the inherent unstable nature of inverted drops. This complexity is further amplified when one attempts to incline the surface. Experimental apparatus to measure pendant drop contact angles on inclined substrates has been developed recently. This method allows for the deposition of multiple microdrops on the underside of a textured substrate, which can be imaged using a high resolution CCD camera. An automated system allows for tilting the substrate and analysing the images for the calculation of advancing and receding contact angles.

=== The dynamic sessile drop method ===
The dynamic sessile drop is similar to the static sessile drop but requires the drop to be modified. A common type of dynamic sessile drop study determines the largest contact angle possible without increasing its solid–liquid interfacial area by adding volume dynamically. This maximum angle is the advancing angle. Volume is removed to produce the smallest possible angle, the receding angle. The difference between the advancing and receding angle is the contact angle hysteresis.

=== Dynamic Wilhelmy method ===
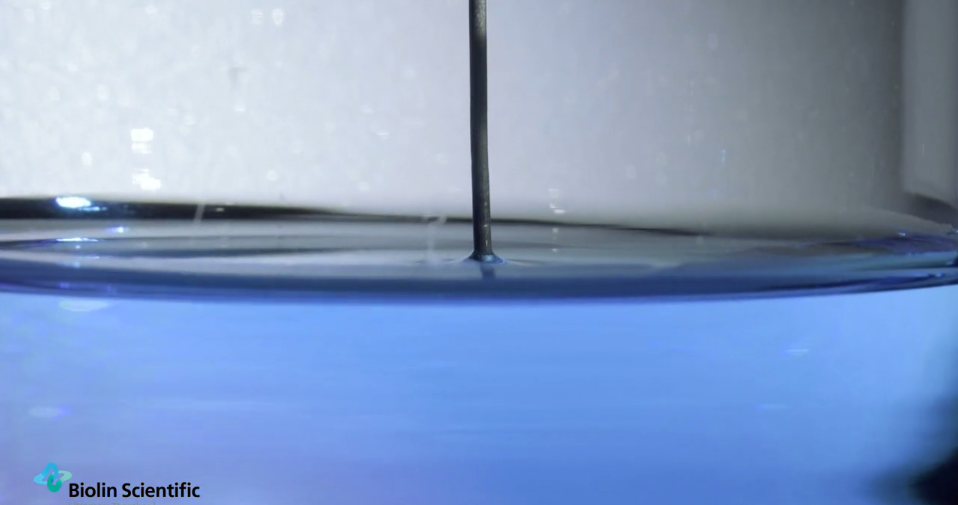
Measuring dynamic contact angle of a rod/fiber with a force tensiometer.

The dynamic Wilhelmy method is a method for calculating average advancing and receding contact angles on solids of uniform geometry. Both sides of the solid must have the same properties. Wetting force on the solid is measured as the solid is immersed in or withdrawn from a liquid of known surface tension. Also in that case it is possible to measure the equilibrium contact angle by applying a very controlled vibration. That methodology, called VIECA, can be implemented in a quite simple way on every Wilhelmy balance.

=== Single-fiber Wilhelmy method ===
Dynamic Wilhelmy method applied to single fibers to measure advancing and receding contact angles.

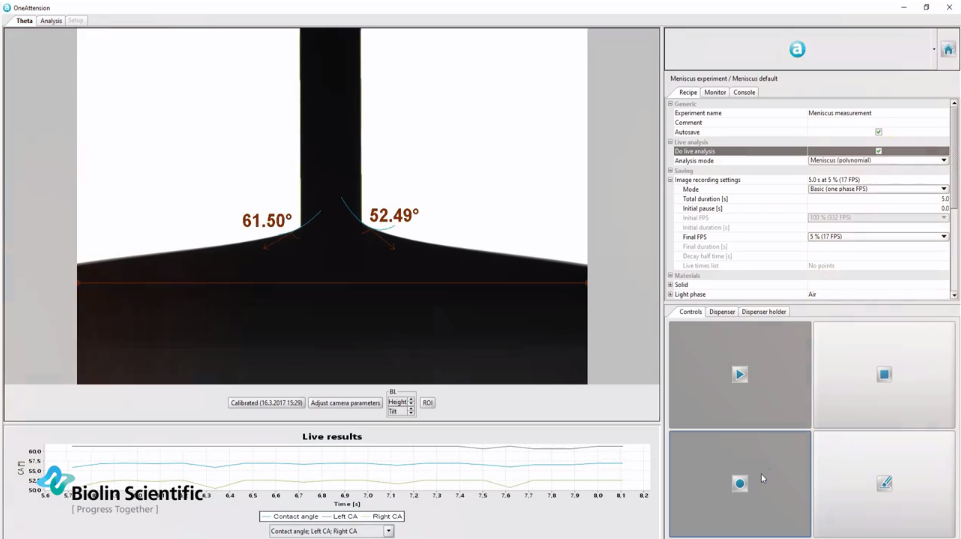
Single-fiber meniscus contact angle measurement.

=== Single-fiber meniscus method ===
An optical variation of the single-fiber Wilhelmy method. Instead of measuring with a balance, the shape of the meniscus on the fiber is directly imaged using a high resolution camera. Automated meniscus shape fitting can then directly measure the static, advancing or receding contact angle on the fiber.

=== Washburn's equation capillary rise method ===
In case of a porous materials many issues have been raised both about the physical meaning of the calculated pore diameter and the real possibility to use this equation for the calculation of the contact angle of the solid, even if this method is often offered by much software as consolidated. Change of weight as a function of time is measured.

== See also ==
- Goniometer
- Meniscus (liquid)
- Porosimetry
- Sessile drop technique
- Surface tension
- Wetting
