= Tensiometer (surface tension) =

Instrument which measures surface tension

In surface science, a tensiometer is a measuring instrument used to measure the surface tension (γ) of liquids or surfaces. Tensiometers are used in research and development laboratories to determine the surface tension of liquids like coatings, lacquers or adhesives. A further application field of tensiometers is the monitoring of industrial production processes like parts cleaning or electroplating.

== Types ==
=== Goniometer/Tensiometer ===
Surface scientists commonly use an optical goniometer/tensiometer to measure the surface tension and interfacial tension of a liquid using the pendant or sessile drop methods. A drop is produced and captured using a CCD camera. The drop profile is subsequently extracted, and sophisticated software routines then fit the theoretical Young–Laplace equation to the experimental drop profile. The surface tension can then be calculated from the fitted parameters. Unlike other methods, this technique requires only a small amount of liquid making it suitable for measuring interfacial tensions of expensive liquids.

=== Du Noüy ring tensiometer ===
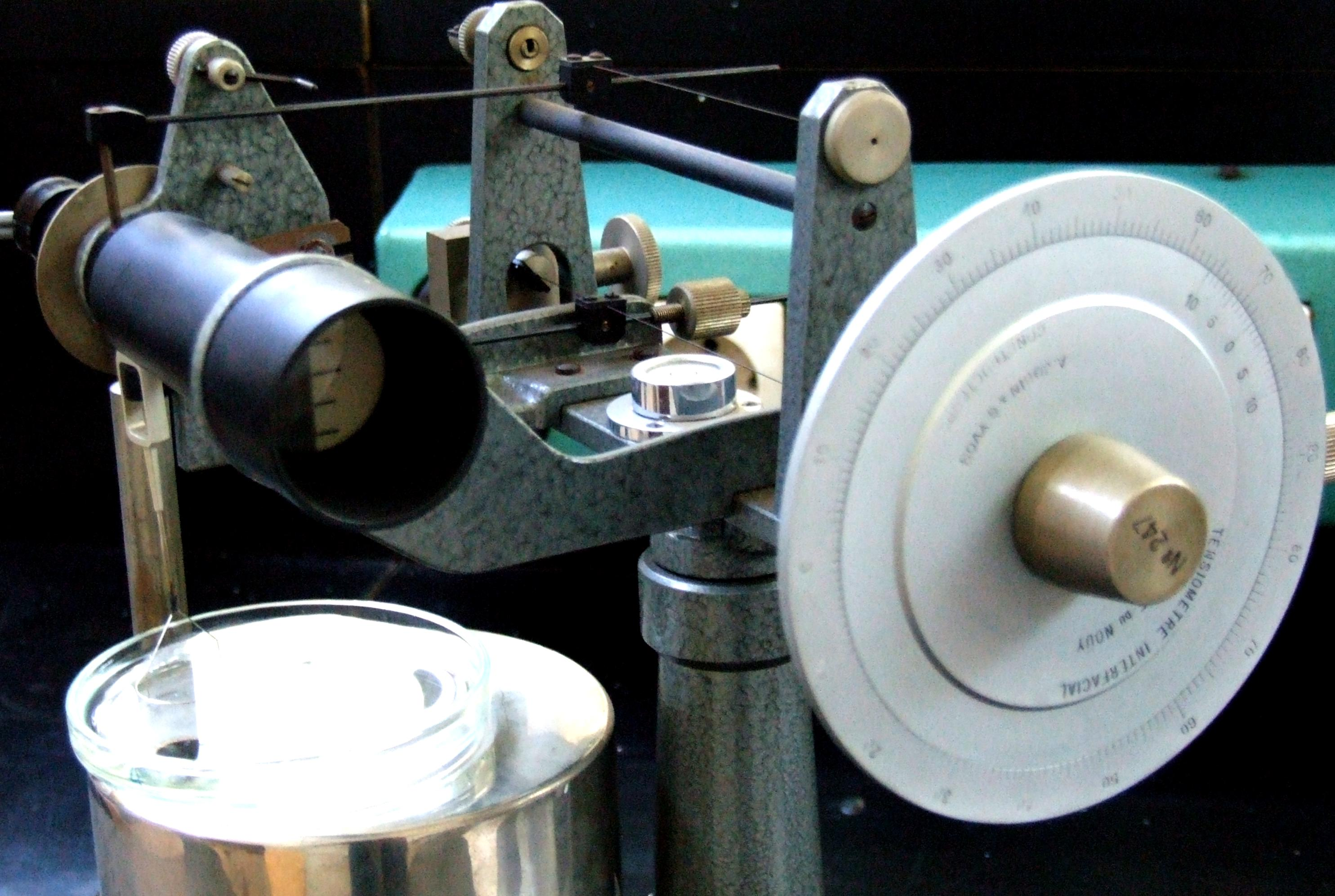
A du Noüy tensiometer

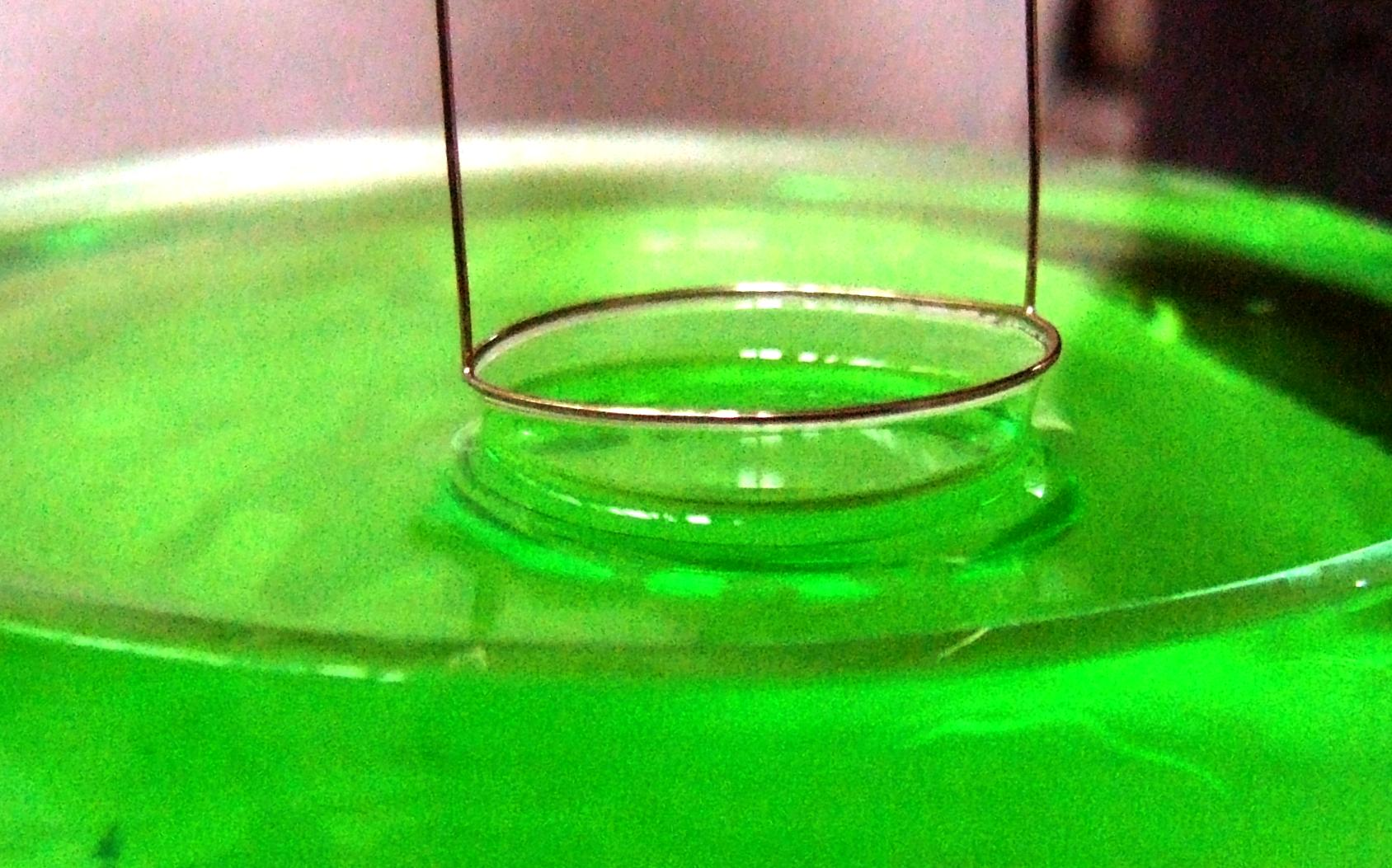
Du Noüy tensiometer in liquid.

This type of tensiometer uses a platinum ring which is submersed in a liquid. As the ring is pulled out of the liquid, the force required is precisely measured in order to determine the surface tension of the liquid.

The method is well-established as shown by a number of international standards on it such as ASTM D971. This method is widely used for interfacial tension measurement between two liquids but care should be taken to make sure to keep the platinum ring undeformed.

=== Wilhelmy plate tensiometer ===
The Wilhelmy plate tensiometer requires a plate to make contact with the liquid surface. It is widely considered the simplest and most accurate method for surface tension measurement. Due to a large wetted length of the platinum plate, the surface tension reading is typically very stable compared to alternative methods. As an additional benefit, the Wilhelmy plate can also be made from paper for disposable use. For interfacial tension measurements, buoyancy of the probe needs to be taken into account which complicates the measurement.

=== Du Noüy-Padday method ===
This method uses a rod which is lowered into a test liquid. The rod is then pulled out of the liquid and the force required to pull the rod is precisely measured. The method isn't standardized but is sometimes used. The Du Noüy-Padday rod pull tensiometer will take measurements quickly and will work with liquids with a wide range of viscosities. Interfacial tensions cannot be measured.

=== Bubble pressure tensiometer ===
Bubble pressure method to measure the dynamic surface tension of liquids

Due to internal attractive forces of a liquid, air bubbles within the liquids are compressed. The resulting pressure (bubble pressure) rises at a decreasing bubble radius. The bubble pressure method makes use of this bubble pressure which is higher than in the surrounding environment (water). A gas stream is pumped into a capillary that is immersed in a fluid. The resulting bubble at the end of the capillary tip continually becomes bigger in surface; thereby, the bubble radius is decreasing.

The pressure rises to a maximum level. At this point the bubble has achieved its smallest radius (the capillary radius) and begins to form a hemisphere. Beyond this point the bubble quickly increases in size and soon bursts, tearing away from the capillary, thereby allowing a new bubble to develop at the capillary tip. It is during this process that a characteristic pressure pattern develops (see picture), which is evaluated for determining the surface tension.

Because of the easy handling and the low cleaning effort of the capillary, bubble pressure tensiometers are a common alternative for monitoring the detergent concentration in cleaning or electroplating processes.

== See also ==
- Stalagmometric method
- Surface tension
- Young–Laplace equation
- Capillary action
- Piezometer
- Pierre Lecomte du Nouy
- Interfacial rheology
