= Capillary (disambiguation) =

A capillary is a small blood vessel or any small diameter tube.

Capillary may also refer to:

- Capillary length, a characteristic length scale in fluid mechanics
- Capillary action, the drawing of liquid into a tube or porous material
- Capillary electrophoresis, the separation of charged species by voltage applied to a small tube
- Capillary wave, is a liquid surface wave (ripples), whose dynamics are dominated by the effects of surface tension
