= Young's equation =

Young's equation may refer to:

- Young–Laplace equation, describes the capillary pressure difference sustained across the interface between two static fluids
- Young–Dupré equation, applies to wetting of ideal solid surfaces
