= Jurin's law =

Analysis of capillary action

Capillary rise or fall in a tube.

Jurin's law, or capillary rise, is the simplest analysis of capillary action—the induced motion of liquids in small channels—and states that the maximum height of a liquid in a capillary tube is inversely proportional to the tube's diameter. Capillary action is one of the most common fluid mechanical effects explored in the field of microfluidics. Jurin's law is named after James Jurin, who discovered it between 1718 and 1719. The difference in height between the surroundings of the tube and the inside, as well as the shape of the meniscus, mathematical expression of this law can be derived directly from hydrostatic principles and the Young–Laplace equation. Jurin's law allows the measurement of the surface tension of a liquid and can be used to derive the capillary length.

== Formulation ==
The law is expressed as

$$\qquad h = \frac{2\gamma \cos\theta}{\rho gr_0}$$,

where

- h is the liquid height;
- $\gamma$ is the surface tension;
- θ is the contact angle of the liquid on the tube wall;
- ρ is the mass density (mass per unit volume);
- r_{0} is the tube radius;
- g is the gravitational acceleration.

It is only valid if the tube is cylindrical and has a radius (r_{0}) smaller than the capillary length ($\lambda_{\rm c}^2=\gamma/(\rho g)$). In terms of the capillary length, the law can be written as

$$\lambda_{\rm c}^2=\frac{hr_0}{2\cos\theta}$$.

== Examples ==
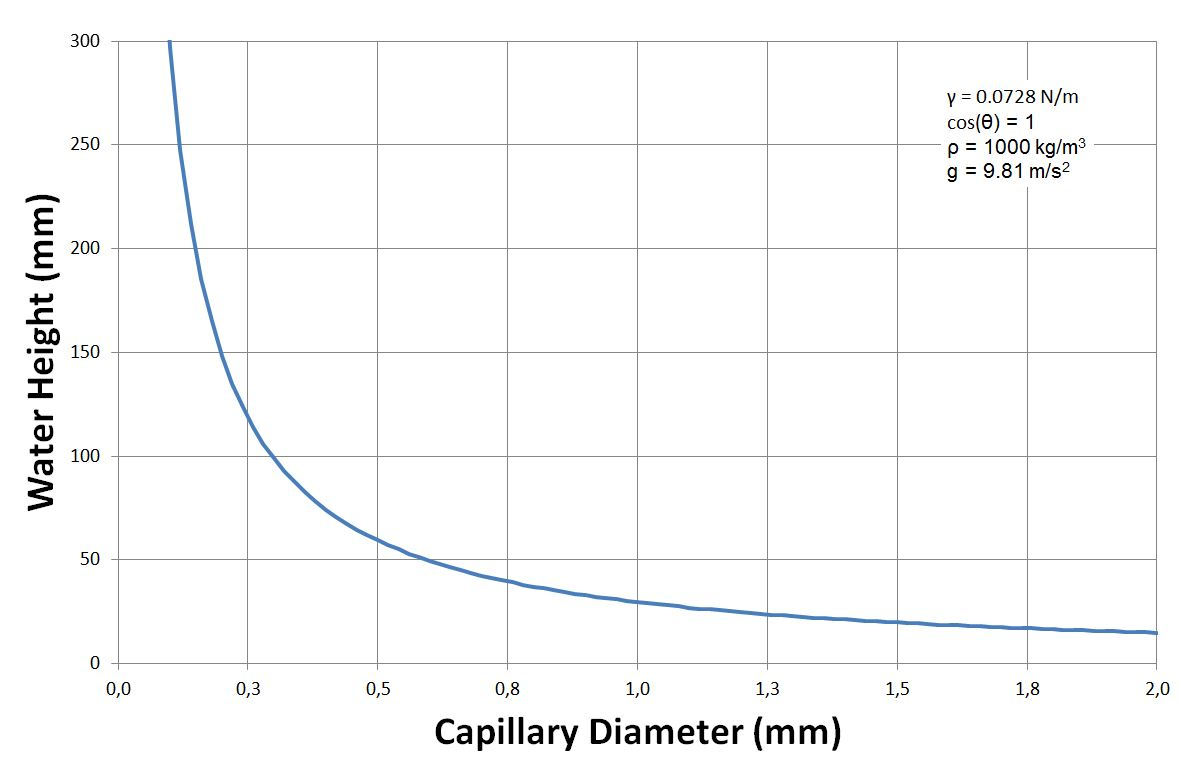
Water height in a capillary tube plotted against diameter.

For a water-filled glass tube in air at standard conditions for temperature and pressure, γ = 0.0728 N/m at 20 °C, ρ = 1000 kg/m^{3}, and g = 9.81 m/s^{2}. Because water spreads on clean glass, the effective equilibrium contact angle is approximately zero. For these values, the height of the water column is

$$h\approx {{1.48 \times 10^{-5}}\over r_0} \ \mbox{m}.$$

Thus for a 2 m (6.6 ft) radius glass tube in lab conditions given above, the water would rise an unnoticeable 0.007 mm (0.00028 in). However, for a 2 cm (0.79 in) radius tube, the water would rise 0.7 mm (0.028 in), and for a 0.2 mm (0.0079 in) radius tube, the water would rise 70 mm (2.8 in).

Capillary action is used by many plants to bring up water from the soil. For tall trees (larger than about 10 m or 33 ft), other processes like osmotic pressure and negative pressures are also important.

== History ==
During the 15th century, Leonardo da Vinci was one of the first to propose that mountain streams could result from the rise of water through small capillary cracks.

It is later, in the 17th century, that the theories about the origin of capillary action begin to appear. Jacques Rohault erroneously supposed that the rise of the liquid in a capillary could be due to the suppression of air inside and the creation of a vacuum. The astronomer Geminiano Montanari was one of the first to compare the capillary action to the circulation of sap in plants. Additionally, the experiments of Giovanni Alfonso Borelli determined in 1670 that the height of the rise was inversely proportional to the radius of the tube.

Francis Hauksbee, in 1713, refuted the theory of Rohault through a series of experiments on capillary action, a phenomenon that was observable in air as well as in vacuum. Hauksbee also demonstrated that the liquid rise appeared on different geometries (not only circular cross sections), and on different liquids and tube materials, and showed that there was no dependence on the thickness of the tube walls. Isaac Newton reported the experiments of Hauskbee in his work Opticks but without attribution.

It was the English physiologist James Jurin, who finally in 1718 confirmed the experiments of Borelli and the law was named in his honour.

== Derivation ==
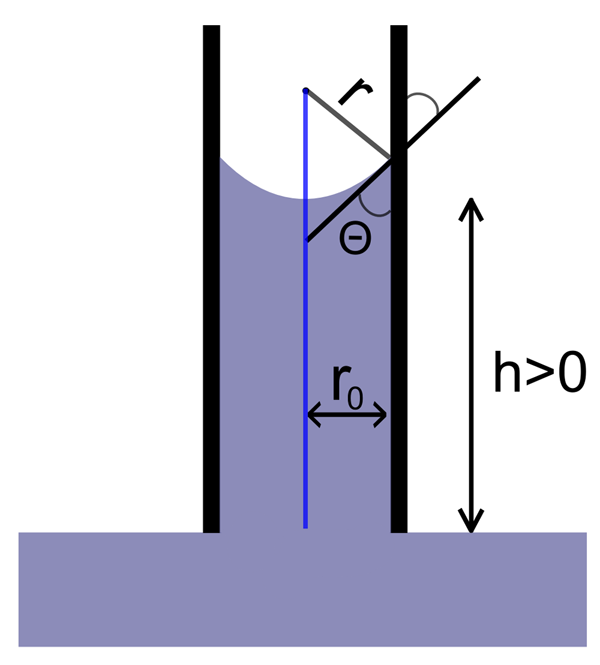
Scheme showing the relevant variables to the problem for a positive height.

The height $h$ of the liquid column in the tube is constrained by the hydrostatic pressure and by the surface tension. The following derivation is for a liquid that rises in the tube; for the opposite case when the liquid is below the reference level, the derivation is analogous but pressure differences may change sign.

=== Hydrostatic pressure ===
A static fluid experiences a simple vertical pressure variation with height:
$$\frac{dp}{dh}=\rho g$$
where $g$ is the gravitational acceleration and $\rho$ the density of the fluid. As the liquid inside the tube communicates with a large, static, open-air reservoir through the open bottom of the tube, the pressure at the surface of that reservoir is simply atmospheric pressure, $p_{\rm atm}$. As the liquid also has constant density, pressure at a height $h$ inside the liquid at the bottom of the tube is
$$p(h)=\rho gh+p_{\rm atm}$$

For much the same reasons, the same equation describes pressure variation in the air above, but with $\rho$ now indicating the (approximately constant) density of air. Consequently there is a pressure difference across the fluid interface, proportional to the height of the interface at each point:
$$\Delta p(h)=-gh\Delta\rho$$
As air is much less dense than water, it is common to approximate $\Delta\rho\approx\rho$.

=== Laplace pressure ===
In fact, $\Delta p$ is approximately a constant, the Laplace pressure. To see this, observe that the formation of menisces in tubes of various sufficiently-small radii is a similar family. Dimensional analysis then implies that the height variation from the bottom to the top of the meniscus must be proportional to the radius of the tube. Since the radius of the tube is assumed small (relative to the capillary length), the height variation across the meniscus is also small, as is variation in $\Delta p$.

By the Young-Laplace equation,
$$\Delta p=-\gamma M$$
where $\gamma$ is the surface tension and $M$ is the mean curvature of the surface. By axisymmetry, the meniscus must be a surface of revolution. The curvature of the meniscus then follows from geometrical considerations. A classical result of differential geometry is that a surface of revolution with constant mean curvature intersecting the axis of rotation is in fact a spherical cap.

The meniscus cross-section is circular, with radius $r$, contacting the tube walls at angle $\theta$. The right triangle made by the vertical, the tube's cross-sectional radius, and a radius to the intersection of the meniscus with the wall implies that $r=r_0/\cos\theta$ (see figure). The Laplace pressure is then calculated as
$$\Delta p=\frac{2\gamma\cos\theta}{r_0}$$

=== Result at equilibrium ===
The hydrostatic analysis shows that $\Delta p=\rho g h$. Combining this with the Laplace pressure calculation we have:
$$\rho g h =\frac{2\gamma \cos\theta}{r_0}$$
Solving for $h$ returns Jurin's law.
