= Thomas Nettleton =

British physician (1683–1742)

Thomas Nettleton (1683–1742) was an English physician who carried out some of the earliest systematic programmes of smallpox inoculation and who went on to statistical investigation of the outcomes.

Little is known of Nettleton other than that he was a physician in Halifax Yorkshire. By 1722, Nettleton was aware of several early accounts of inoculation when a smallpox outbreak occurred in his area. He went on to inoculate at least sixty people and reported the results in 1724. However, it was only later that year that he considered the difference in mortality between those who had received the smallpox inoculation and those who had not. It was his letter to James Jurin that motivated Jurin himself to gather further data and perform his own analysis.

I would only . . . leave to remark, that it appears from these Accounts, that this last Year, in this Part of the Kingdom, almost nineteen out of every hundred, or near one fifth of those, who have had the natural Small Pox, have died; whereas out of sixty one which have been inoculated hereabouts, not one has died ...

— Nettleton to Jurin (1724)
