= James Jurin =

British mathematician and doctor

James Jurin FRS FRCP
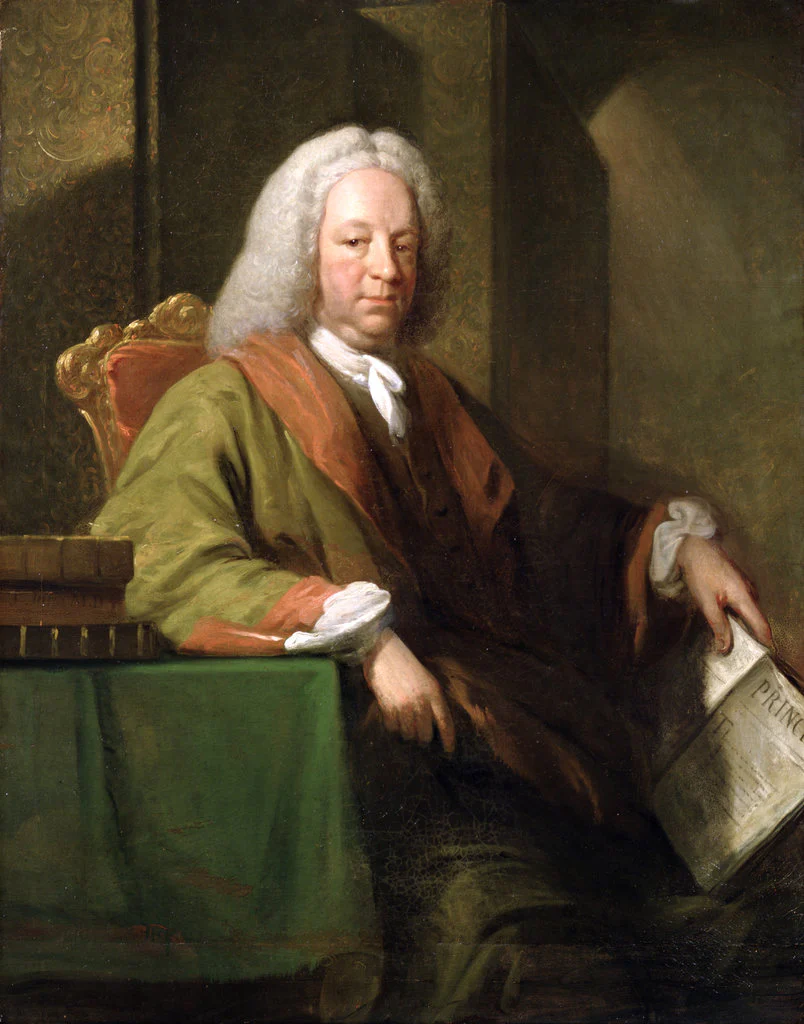
- James Jurin (1684–1750)
- Born: baptised 15 December 1684; London, England
- Died: 29 March 1750 (aged 65); London, England
- Education: Trinity College, Cambridge
- Known for: Jurin's law Iatrophysics
- Scientific career
- Fields: Scientist and physician
- Workplaces: Royal Grammar School, Newcastle; Guy's Hospital
- Academic advisors: Roger Cotes; William Whiston; Richard Bentley
- Notable students: Mordecai Cary

James Jurin FRS (baptised 15 December 1684 – 29 March 1750) was an English scientist and physician, particularly remembered for his early work in capillary action and in the epidemiology of smallpox vaccination. He was a staunch proponent of the work of Sir Isaac Newton and often used his gift for satire in Newton's defence. In 1716 he was present—along with Newton, Robert Smith, William Whiston, and Edmund Halley—when Martin Folkes proposed the black Jamaican Francis Williams for fellowship of the Royal Society.

== Early life ==
Jurin's father was John Jurin, a London dyer. His mother was John's wife Dorcas Cotesworth. He was educated at Christ's Hospital where he won a scholarship to Trinity College, Cambridge, graduating BA in 1705, and being elected fellow the following year. Becoming the protégé of the master of Trinity, Richard Bentley, Jurin became tutor to Mordecai Cary, travelling with him internationally. Jurin achieved his MA in 1709 and became headteacher of the Royal Grammar School, Newcastle. Jurin became a frequent public speaker on mathematics and the work of Sir Isaac Newton. Jurin returned to Cambridge in 1715 to study medicine, becoming MD the following year and establishing a successful practice in London and Tunbridge Wells. In 1722, he lectured on anatomy to the Company of Surgeons. From 1725 to 1732 he worked as a physician at Guy's Hospital, thereafter becoming a governor of the hospital. In 1724, Jurin married Mary Douglas, née Harris (died 1784), wealthy widow of Oley Douglas, and they had five daughters and one son.

== Medical practice ==
Jurin rose to a position of some eminence in medicine and science. He is described as "witty, satirical, ambitious, and professionally and financially successful". He was a powerful advocate of the smallpox variolation, a procedure involving scratching pus or material from the scabs of smallpox sores into the veins of a non-immune person to create a mild case of the disease that would confer lifelong immunity. Jurin used an early statistical study to compare the risks of variolation with those from contracting the disease naturally. He studied mortality statistics for London for the fourteen years prior to 1723 and concluded that one fourteenth of the population had died from smallpox, up to 40 percent during epidemics. He advertised in the Proceedings of the Royal Society for readers to report their personal and professional experiences and received over sixty replies, most from other physicians or surgeons, but most significantly from Thomas Nettleton who reported his own calculations from his experience in several communities in Yorkshire. Jurin's analysis concluded that the probability of death from variolation was roughly 1 in 50, while the probability of death from naturally contracted smallpox was 1 in 7 or 8. He published his results in a series of annual pamphlets, An Account of the Success of Inoculating the Small-Pox (1723–1727). His work was very influential in establishing smallpox variolation in England some seventy years before Edward Jenner introduced the more effective method of "vaccination" using cowpox material in place of human smallpox. Jurin claimed that he had given "plain Proof from Experience and Matters of Fact that the Small Pox procured by inoculation ... is far less Dangerous than the same Distemper has been for many Years in the Natural Way."

== Newtonian scientist ==
Jurin was an "ardent Newtonian". He had studied under Roger Cotes and William Whiston at Cambridge but only came to know Newton at the Royal Society, where Jurin was Secretary towards the end of Newton's Presidency. Always advocating the Newtonian position, he was a keen controversialist, corresponding with Voltaire, Georges-Louis Leclerc, Comte de Buffon and Émilie du Châtelet. He took an active part in defending Newton and attacking Gottfried Leibniz in the debate over vis viva, opposing the views of Benjamin Robins and Pietro Antonio Michelotti. Jurin fostered international observational research into weather and meteorology, and studied the phenomenon of capillary action, deriving the rule that the height of liquid in a capillary tube is inversely proportional to the diameter of the tube at the surface of the liquid only, a law sometimes known as Jurin's law. He published on hydrodynamics and was critical of Jean and Daniel Bernoulli's work. Jurin worked on iatrophysics, investigating the mechanical behaviour of the heart and the specific gravity of blood, debating the heart with James Keill and Jean-Baptiste de Sénac. He wrote an addendum (1738) On Distinct and Indistinct Vision to Robert Smith's Opticks and engaged in a lively epistollary exchange with Robins on the topic. With help from Edmond Halley and Roger Cotes, Jurin published a revised and translated Geographia Generalis, based on Newton's editions of the work. This was partly to counter the Cartesianism movement at Cambridge who had taken to using the text, and to advance Newtonianism.

== Controversy with Berkeley ==
In 1734, George Berkeley published The Analyst in which he attacked the calculus as flawed and ultimately absurd. Between 1734 and 1742, Jurin published over three hundred pages in robust rebuttal of Berkeley, many of them employing his favourite weapon of satire. The publications, some under the pseudonym Philalethes Cantabrigensis, included Geometry no Friend to Infidelity, or A Defence of Sir Isaac Newton & the British Mathematicians (1734) and The Minute Mathematician, or The Freethinker no Just Thinker (1735). Berkeley quickly withdrew from the debate and Jurin turned his attentions on Robins and Henry Pemberton. The controversy was re-ignited years later when Jurin wrote negatively in response to Berkeley's promotion of tar-water.

== Later life ==
Jurin attended Robert Walpole as his physician and prescribed lixivium lithontripticum for Walpole's bladder stones. Jurin had used a similar prescription for himself but Walpole died and Jurin was blamed for his death, again necessitating an energetic pamphlet campaign to defend his practice. Jurin died in London and was buried at St James Garlickhythe. His estate was valued at £35,000 (£4.9 million at 2003 prices).

His bust, by Peter Scheemakers stands in Trinity College, Cambridge.

== Offices and honours ==
Royal Society	Royal College of Physicians
Fellow, (1717)	Candidate, (1718)
Secretary, (1721–1727)	Fellow, (1719)
Editor of volumes 31–34 of the Philosophical Transactions	Censor five times during the period 1724–1750
	Consilarius, with Richard Mead, (1749)
	President, (1750)

== See also ==
- Zabdiel Boylston
