= Two-balloon experiment =

Physics experiment used to demonstrate elasticity

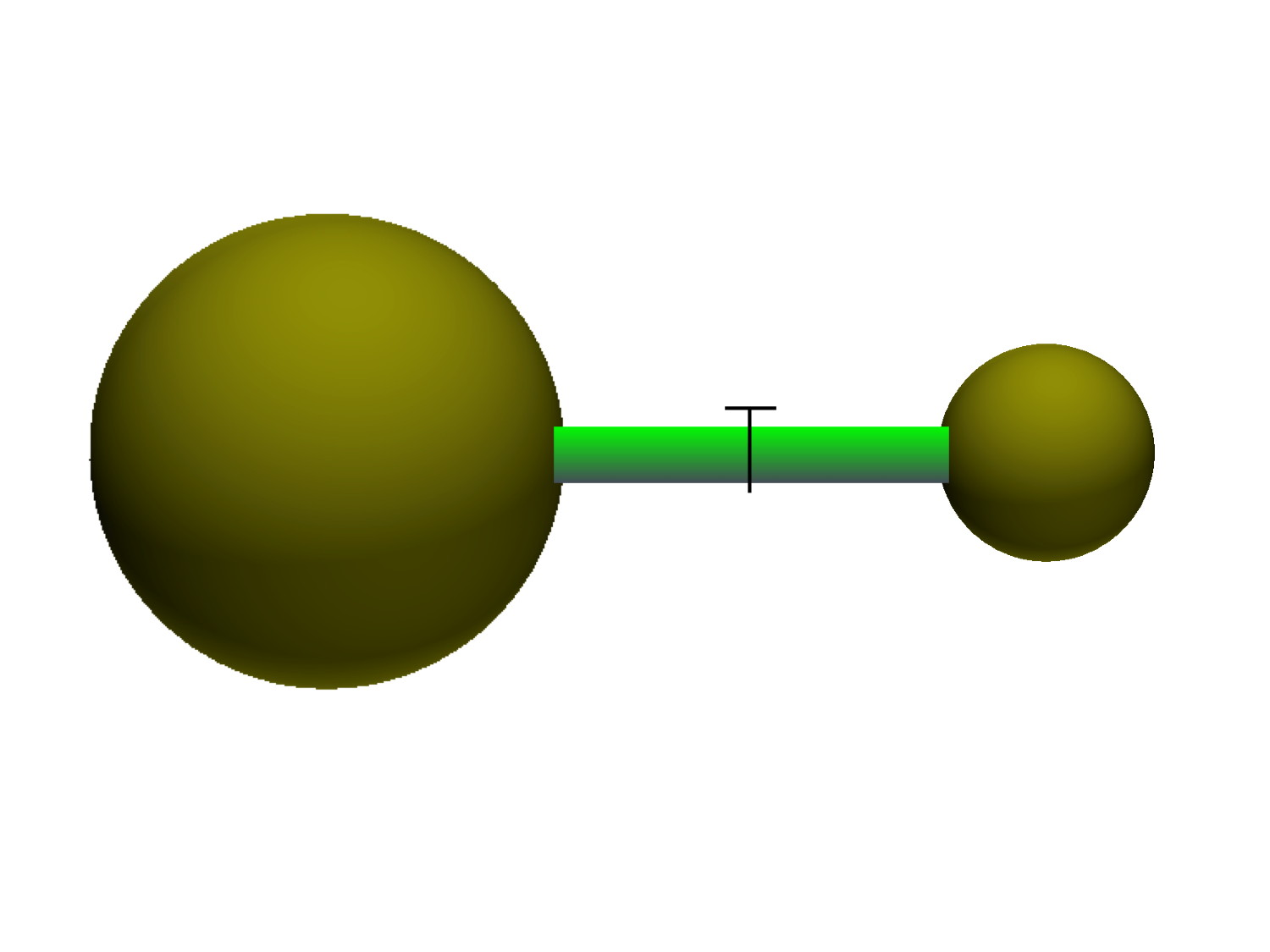
Fig. 1. Two balloons are connected via a hollow tube. When the valve is opened, the smaller balloon shrinks and the larger balloon expands.

The two-balloon experiment is an experiment involving interconnected balloons. It is used in physics classes as a demonstration of elasticity.

Two identical balloons are inflated to different diameters and connected by means of a tube. The flow of air through the tube is controlled by a valve or clamp. The clamp is then released, allowing air to flow between the balloons. For many starting conditions, the smaller balloon then gets smaller and the balloon with the larger diameter inflates even more. This result is surprising, since most people assume that the two balloons will have equal sizes after exchanging air.

The behavior of the balloons in the two-balloon experiment was first explained theoretically by David Merritt and Fred Weinhaus in 1978.

== Theoretical pressure curve ==
The key to understanding the behavior of the balloons is understanding how the pressure inside a balloon varies with the balloon's diameter. The simplest way to do this is to imagine that the balloon is made up of a large number of small rubber patches, and to analyze how the size of a patch is affected by the force acting on it.

The James–Guth stress–strain relation for a parallelepiped of ideal rubber can be written

$$f_i = {1\over L_i}\left[kKT\left({L_i\over L_i^0}\right)^2-pV\right].$$

Here, f_{i} is the externally applied force in the ith direction, L_{i} is a linear dimension, k is the Boltzmann constant, K is a constant related to the number of possible network configurations of the sample, T is the absolute temperature, L_{i}^{0} is an unstretched dimension, p is the internal (hydrostatic) pressure, and V is the volume of the sample. Thus, the force consists of two parts: the first one (caused by the polymer network) gives a tendency to contract, while the second gives a tendency to expand.

Suppose that the balloon is composed of many such interconnected patches, which deform in a similar way as the balloon expands. Because rubber strongly resists volume changes, the volume V can be considered constant. This allows the stress-strain relation to be written

$$f_i = (C_1/L_i)(\lambda_i^2 - C_2p)$$

where λ_{i} = L_{i}/L_{i}^{0} is the relative extension. In the case of a thin-walled spherical shell, all the force which acts to stretch the rubber is directed tangentially to the surface. The radial force (i.e., the force acting to compress the shell wall) can therefore be set equal to zero, so that

$$\lambda_r^2 = (t/t_0)^2 = C_2p$$

where t_{0} and t refer to the initial and final thicknesses, respectively. For a balloon of radius $r$, a fixed volume of rubber means that r^{2}t is constant, or equivalently

$$t \propto \frac{1}{r^2}$$

hence

$$\frac{t}{t_0} = \left(\frac{r_0}{r}\right)^2$$

and the radial force equation becomes

$$p = \frac{1}{C_2} \left(\frac{r_0}{r}\right)^4$$

The equation for the tangential force f_{t} (where L_{t} $\propto$ r) then becomes

$$f_t \propto (r/r_0^2)\left[1-(r_0/r)^6\right].$$

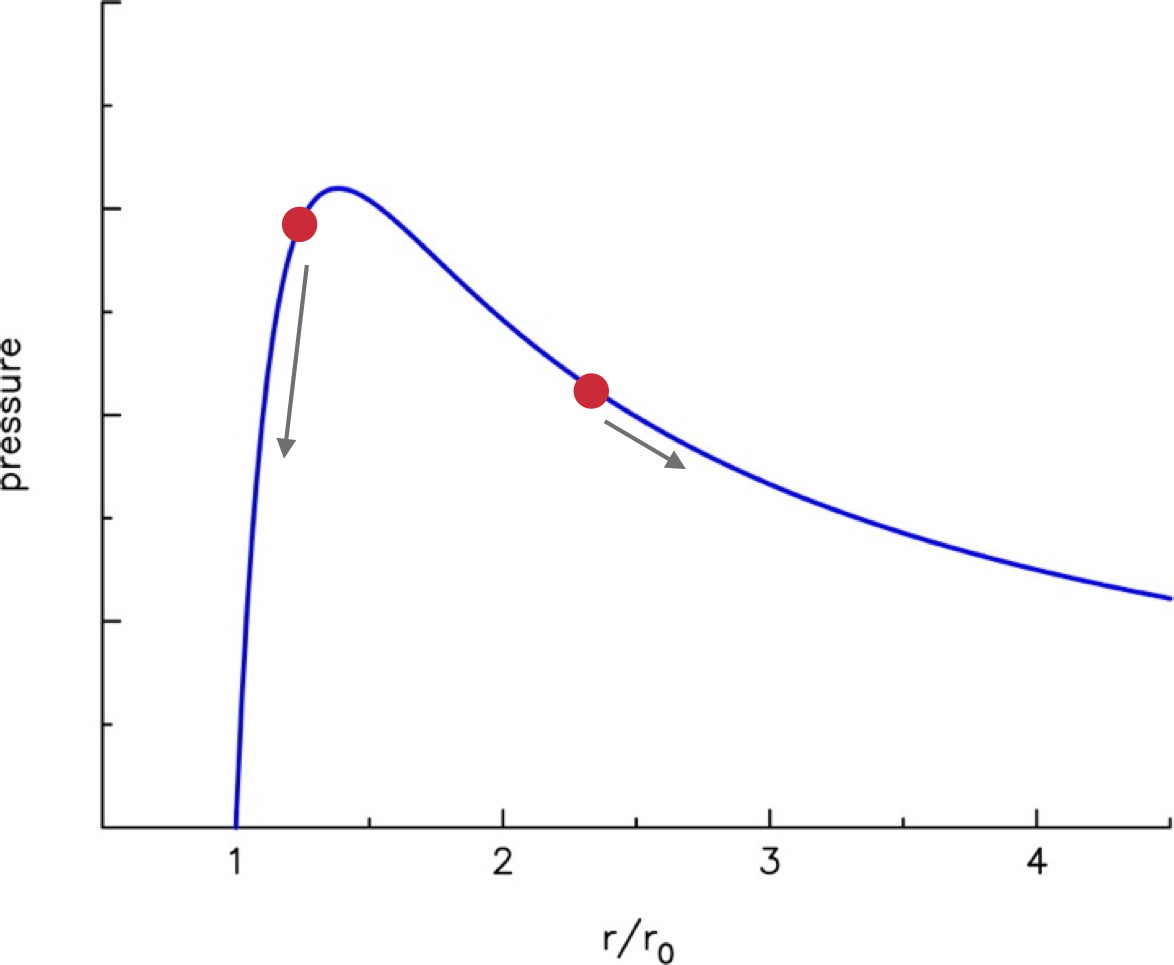
Fig. 2. Pressure curve for an ideal rubber balloon. When air is first added to the balloon, the pressure rises rapidly to a peak. Adding more air causes the pressure to drop. The two points show typical initial conditions for the experiment. When the valve is opened, the balloons move in the direction indicated by the arrows.

Integrating the internal air pressure over one hemisphere of the balloon then gives

$$P_\mathrm{in} - P_\mathrm{out} \equiv P = \frac{f_t}{\pi r^2} = \frac{C}{r_0^2r}
\left[1-\left(\frac{r_0}{r}\right)^6 \right]$$

where r_{0} is the balloon's uninflated radius.

This equation is plotted in the figure at left. The internal pressure P reaches a maximum for

$$r=r_p=7^{1/6}r_0\approx 1.38 r_0$$

and drops to zero as r increases. This behavior is well known to anyone who has blown up a balloon: a large force is required at the start, but after the balloon expands (to a radius larger than r_{p}), less force is needed for continued inflation.

When both balloons are initially inflated to the peak pressure, spontaneous symmetry breaking will occur, since the pressure in both balloons will drop when some air flows from one balloon into the other.

== Why does the larger balloon expand? ==
When the valve is released, air will flow from the balloon at higher pressure to the balloon at lower pressure. The lower pressure balloon will expand. Figure 2 (above left) shows a typical initial configuration: The smaller balloon has the higher pressure because of the sum of pressure of the elastic force Fe which is proportional to the pressure (P=Fe/S) plus the air pressure in the small balloon is greater than the air pressure in the big balloon. So, when the valve is opened, the smaller balloon pushes air into the larger balloon. It becomes smaller, and the larger balloon becomes larger. The air flow ceases when the two balloons have equal pressure, with one on the left branch of the pressure curve (r < r_{p}) and one on the right branch (r > r_{p}).

Equilibria are also possible in which both balloons have the same size. If the total quantity of air in both balloons is less than N_{p}, defined as the number of molecules in both balloons if they both sit at the peak of the pressure curve, then both balloons settle down to the left of the pressure peak with the same radius, r < r_{p}. On the other hand, if the total number of molecules exceeds N_{p}, the only possible equilibrium state is the one described above, with one balloon on the left of the peak and one on the right. Equilibria in which both balloons are on the right of the pressure peak also exist but are unstable. This is easy to verify by squeezing the air back and forth between two interconnected balloons.

== Non-ideal balloons ==
At large extensions, the pressure inside a natural rubber balloon once again goes up. This is due to a number of physical effects that were ignored in the James/Guth theory: crystallization, imperfect flexibility of the molecular chains, steric hindrances and the like. As a result, if the two balloons are initially very extended, other outcomes of the two-balloon experiment are possible, and this makes the behavior of rubber balloons more complex than, say, interconnected soap bubbles. In addition, natural rubber exhibits hysteresis: the pressure depends not just on the balloon diameter, but also on the manner in which inflation took place and on the initial direction of change. For instance, the pressure during inflation is always greater than the pressure during subsequent deflation at a given radius. One consequence is that equilibrium will generally be obtained with a lesser change in diameter than would have occurred in the ideal case. The system has been modeled by a number of authors, for example to produce phase diagrams specifying under what conditions the small balloon can inflate the larger, or the other way round.

== Applications ==
The two-balloon instability may play a role in the early stages of reproduction. As some germ cells grow, others shrink, and fluid flow between interconnected cells causes the shrinking (smaller) cell to undergo cell death while the larger cell eventually becomes an egg. Bio-physical models suggest that this process is effectively similar to the behavior of the balloons in the two-balloon experiment

Due to a shortage of ventilators during the COVID-19 pandemic, it has been proposed that one ventilator could be shared between two patients. However Tronstad et al. found that when the two sets of lungs had very different elasticities or airway resistance, there could be large discrepancies in the amount of air delivered. They argued that this might be seen as an example of the two-balloon experiment, with the two sets of lungs playing the role of the two balloons: "The 'two-balloon effect' (Merritt and Weinhaus 1978) could possibly have contributed to this volume discrepancy, and the inclusion of one-way valves could possibly help."

== See also ==
- Elastomer
- Artificial ventilation
- Laplace pressure
- Spontaneous symmetry breaking
