= Iatrophysics =

Medical application of physics

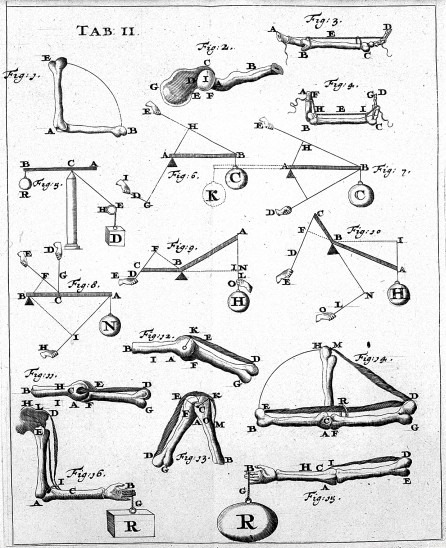
A page from Giovanni Borelli's De Motu Animalium, showing how various simple machines can be used to model different limbs

Iatrophysics or iatromechanics (fr. Greek) is the medical application of physics. It provides an explanation for medical practices with mechanical principles. It was a school of medicine in the seventeenth century which attempted to explain physiological phenomena in mechanical terms. Believers of iatromechanics thought that physiological phenomena of the human body followed the laws of physics. It was related to iatrochemistry in studying the human body in a systematic manner based on observations from the natural world though it had more emphasis on mathematical models rather than chemical processes.

== Background ==
The Age of Enlightenment was an era of radically changing ways of thought in Western politics, philosophy, and science. Major sociological changes occurred in the Enlightenment, as well as industrial and scientific. In medicine, the Enlightenment brought several discoveries and studies that were impacted by changing ways of thought. For example, capillaries were discovered by Marcello Malpighi. Jan Baptist van Helmont (1580–1644) was the first to consider digestion a fermentation process and identified hydrochloric acid in the stomach. Pathological anatomy and clinical observation were also being integrated into the medical curriculum. The Enlightenment also directly influenced the field of iatrophysics through the development of Antonie von Leeuwenhoek's microscope, the advancement of the field of ophthalmology through the use of physics by René Descartes, and Newton's law of universal gravitation, idea of gravitational force, and his treatise Opticks.

== Subfields ==
Iatrophysicists drew inspiration from various established physical phenomena in order to explain how certain biological processes took place and how this can be applied towards medicine.

=== Particles ===
A key component of iatrophysical anatomy was the study of particles. This was particularly influenced by 17th century developments in microbiology, the most prominent being the microscope. Antonie von Leeuwenhoeck was a Dutch scientist who is known for his use of the microscope for identifying single-celled organisms. He was also the first to observe muscle fibers, bacteria, spermatozoa and blood flow in capillaries. Another famous figure in microbiology at the time was Robert Hooke, an English scientist most famous for his use of the microscope for the discovery of cells. In his most famous work, Micrographia (1665), he attributed "occult properties" as elementary "contrivances of nature". Like Galileo Galilei, he shared an iatrophysical viewpoint and saw living organisms as groups of small machines. The development of the microscope was largely influential in this view.

=== Mechanics ===
Machines were used as models by Iatrophysicists to quantitatively describe linear and rotational motion of various biological systems such as human limbs and animals. Some models came into existence before Isaac Newton's formulation of his three laws in classical mechanics, drawing on basic principles of statics and dynamics to represent how a biological system behaved. Giovanni Borelli was prolific in applying mechanics to a wide variety of humans and animals in different degrees of activity, drawing upon an array of simple machines and models for translational and rotational motion and equilibrium.

=== Fluids ===
Iatrophysicists were also interested in studying how bodily liquids and gases were processed. They sought to understand how blood circulated throughout the body and what effects it made on the body. System consisted of arteries, veins, and vasculature verified through experiment and microscope by Marcello Malpighi's observations of capillaries in animal lung tissue. Albrecht von Haller, as did Borelli, postulated that friction from the blood on vessel walls lead to body heat and even fever. A hydraulic model for motion by René Descartes implied the body had a system that maintained flow between the brain and muscles in equilibrium state through nerves and blood vessels.

== Iatrophysicists ==
Starting in the 17th century, quantitative fields such as physics and mathematics began gaining legitimacy as a means of studying the natural world with the advent of theory, practices, and instruments. Static principles and simple machines were already in use to create various objects and buildings and thus were established tools that could be used to inspire models of biological systems. The development of medical instruments and techniques, such as the microscope and detailed dissections, changed how natural philosophers thought about how to explain the human body's properties. By enabling more detailed study of aspects of biology, let alone the human body, instrumentation and methods to directly study organic tissue allowed more opportunities for natural philosophers, Iatrophysicists in this case, to postulate and verify their theories. With inspiration from established explanations of natural phenomena and new informative means to study the human body available, iatrophysicists aimed to describe the human body and assert their explanation of various systems of the human body.

One example is the muscle and contraction. Various explanations on a macroscopic and microscopic scale were made to explain how muscles contracted and thus performed movements together. On a macroscopic scale through observation and anatomy, some iatrophysicists such as Borelli focused on explaining how muscles worked in conjunction together to form movements with dynamics or physical models. On a microscopic scale via observation and dissection, the contractility of muscle was to be explained by pneumatic expansion, a popular explanation supported by Descartes and Borelli, or inherent shape deformation, postulated by Nicolas Steno and Albrecht von Haller to an extent, based upon principles of fluids and statics. Other aspects of the human body such as circulation and digestion saw a number of explanations, and thus conflicting views based on the methodology used to derive and obtain an explanation, arise in the 17th and 18th centuries.

=== Prominent Iatrophysicists ===
One prominent iatrophysicist was Giovanni Borelli, who modeled the human body, various animals, and their motions using mechanical principles. A colleague of Marcello Malphigi, Borelli was a mathematician who made connections between what he observed in living things and inanimate but relatively simple systems. He dissected animals and examined how muscles were to increase mechanical advantage, observed how a variety of living things performed different movements and activities such as running, carrying loads, swimming, and flying naturally rather than by his intervention, and devised simple methods to calculate a person's center of mass. He also devised relatively simple experiments and devices to make his observations such as a plank and rod for center of mass and a spirometer for volume of air. At the end of his life, his work culminated in De Motu Animalium (1679), a publication showcasing his investigations in similarities and differences in muscles across living things and his understanding of the underlying mechanism of muscle contraction, expansion via influx of fluids or gases released from nerves. He also attempted to describe more complicated processes such as nerve transmission and digestion.

Another notable iatrophysicist was the French philosopher and mathematician René Descartes, who, as a consequence of his philosophy asserting that the human body and soul are two dual entities, treated the human body as a machine that could be quantified, disassembled, and studied. He attempted to model various phenomena such as the brain, movement, sleep, circulation, and senses with analogies to inanimate objects such as reservoirs, pipes, lenses and steam engines that often sought to maintain an equilibrium for certain states. Some of his claims often were independent of physical observation of the organ or body in question and emphasized what he deemed as "simple" or "rational" rather than reality. For example, he asserts that blood circulates throughout the body by expanding as vapor by the heart's heat rather than from contraction.

William Harvey postulated blood flow as a closed, continuous loop that run throughout body that contained a certain quantity of blood. To test his claim, Harvey dissected human corpses and animals and, based on his anatomical findings, devised a simple demonstration of how arteries and veins continuously carried blood throughout the body. Taking advantage of the fact that arteries and veins were at different depths below the skin, he tied a person's arm and had them squeeze a bar to shunt blood from arteries to veins, indicating that blood somehow traveled along arteries and into veins. His claim was elucidated by Malphigi's discovery of capillaries and how they were interconnected with arteries and veins.

One of the most influential iatrophysicists was Hermann Boerhaave, a Dutch physician and chemist at the Leiden University. Like other iatrophysicists, he viewed physiology as a mechanism. While he disagreed with the idea that the body and the mind were connected, he attributed everything related to the body to extension, impenetrability, or motion.

Francis Glisson was known for his work on circulation of the blood, the mechanisms of the nervous system, and hereditary diseases. He was largely influenced by Harvey's work on the sentient nature of blood and his work demonstrates iatrophysical ideology particularly through his views of attraction and irritability, or the concept of how the body fibers react to irritation. In his work, Anatomia hepatis, he argues that branches cross, and carried blood is separated in the liver. This in turn is sucked up by biliary vessels through an attraction that Glisson attributes as similar, magnetic, or natural.

Albrecht von Haller was another prominent iatrophysicist, who like Glisson, focused on physiology as mechanisms of body fibers. He shared Glisson's views on irritability, but unlike Glisson, attributed the reaction to external stimuli solely to body fibers, and not in the inherent power of matter as Glisson had suggested. In his work Physiologiae Corporis Humani (1757–1766), he described organs and muscles of the body as interwoven fibers. His viewpoints on muscles were that they had a contractile tendency which he termed vis mortua, or dead power. He attributed this muscle contraction to irritability, which he described as being an inherent power. He particularly made the distinction between irritability and sensibility, irritability being the power of muscular contraction and sensibility being nerve impulse. Therefore, a part was irritable if it contracted upon contact, and sensible if the contact impacted the mind.

=== Other Iatrophysicists ===
Santorio Santorio was a Venetian doctor who, in attempt to quantify human digestion, carefully measured his food/water intake and excretion weight over many years. To establish a mathematical relationship between food/water intake and excretion, Santorius designed a special chair that had a balance that weighed a subject's meal and consequent excrement. Based on these measurements, he then calculated the net change in weight for each day. In addition to knowing what he took in, he also analyzed the contents of his excretions and secretions, categorizing it by type and origin. He also made other clinical instruments to measure other medical quantities such as temperature and pulse.

Nicolas Steno was a Danish scientist who developed a purely mechanical and geometrical model of muscle. In this model, he treated a muscle as an interwoven yet simple network of long fibers, forming a uniform and robust geometric shape. Contraction was then explained as the reshaping of this network to either shorten or lengthen along one direction, thus the muscle changed shape at a fixed volume by only changing the angles between each fibre. This explanation of contraction, and his consequent theory that the heart contracted by many of its fibers shortening and lengthening, was considered radical. The most popular explanation, supported by well known Iatrophysicists such as Descartes and Borelli, asserted that the heart contracted from its fibers inflating themselves through a chemical reaction.

== Relationship with Iatrochemistry ==
Similar to iatrophysics, iatrochemistry was a school of thought that related medicine and anatomy to chemistry, instead of mechanics. Iatrophysics and iatrochemistry were closely related. Many prominent iatrophysicists such as Borelli and Descartes utilized chemistry in order to explain physiological processes. Particularly, Franciscus Sylvius was an adamant believer in chemical processes as an explanation for the body. He emphasized fermentation and effervescence for the input of chemistry and circulation into physiology.

Iatrochemistry and iatrophysics had similar ways of thinking, and went hand-in-hand in many aspects. But they also conflicted at times. For example, the concept of fermentation arose from an iatrochemical background. Like the Parisian apothecary Henri Louis de Rouvière, who connected fermentation with health in his book titled: Reflexions sur la Fermentation, et sur la Nature du Feu (1708). However, this publication also dismissed the relationship of mechanics with health and the mechanistic model of the body. Another conflict arose in explanation of digestion. While iatrophysicists explained the event through mechanistic terms, iatrochemists argued for fermentation as the reason for the digestive processes in the body. Furthermore, while iatrophysicists rejected acid-base theory as an explanation for bodily processes, iatrochemists embraced the theory.

== Influence on Medicine ==
In the Middle Ages, Galenic anatomo-physiology prevailed as the leading medical thought. Furthermore, Aristotelian natural philosophy had dominated for centuries, including the humoral system as a primary method of medical thought. However, the philosophies of Aristotle, Hippocrates, and Galen began to wane in popularity, replaced by anatomical and philosophical schools of thought based on mechanics and chemical naturalism. Ideologies such as iatrophysics and iatrochemistry began to prevail. The decline of Galenic philosophy-based medicine coupled with the rise of new ideologies was spurred by the advent of new discoveries in anatomy and physiology, such as that of William Harvey's work centered on circulation of the blood. His idea that pulse, respiration, and nutrition were all working components of a unified system revolutionized preexisting ideas about blood, nutrition, and heat. The discovery of the circulation of the blood was crucial in the development of iatrophysics in that it was the first that related "circulations" to physiological functions. This led to the advent of new discoveries such as the circulation of nutritive fluid, circulation of lymph, and circulation of nervous juice, all of which relate a machine-like mechanism to anatomy.

Traditionally, physiological functions were believed to be regulated by purposeful tendencies. However, the advent of the new medicinal schools of thought transformed the way physiology was approached. Secretion and excretion were no longer due to attractive tendencies, the function of the lungs were now due to the mixing of different parts of the blood, digestion was seen as a process of grinding and mincing, and health and disease were associated with movement, obstruction, and stagnation of the various bodily fluids running through the body. The body increasingly became viewed as a function of a machine, especially with the development of Isaac Newton's theory of gravitation and motion. Newtonian physics came to widely influence the way the body was viewed, and physiology was increasingly focused on a clockwork mechanism, and the later hydraulics was even applied to the movement of bodily fluids. Furthermore, with the publication of Newton's Opticks in 1704, physiologists increasingly depended on the notions of ether and effluvia in their anatomical observations.
