= Laplace pressure =

Pressure difference between the inside and the outside of a curved surface

Experimental demonstration of Laplace pressure with soap bubbles.

The Laplace pressure is the pressure difference between the inside and the outside of a curved surface that forms the boundary between two fluid regions. The pressure difference is caused by the surface tension of the interface between liquid and gas, or between two immiscible liquids.

The Laplace pressure is determined from the Young–Laplace equation given as $\Delta P \equiv P_\text{inside} - P_\text{outside} = \gamma\left(\frac{1}{R_1}+\frac{1}{R_2}\right),$ where $R_1$ and $R_2$ are the principal radii of curvature and $\gamma$ (also denoted as $\sigma$) is the surface tension. Although signs for these values vary, sign convention usually dictates positive curvature when convex and negative when concave.

The Laplace pressure is commonly used to determine the pressure difference in spherical shapes such as bubbles or droplets. In this case, $R_1$ = $R_2$: $\Delta P = \gamma\frac{2}{R}$

For a gas bubble within a liquid, there is only one surface. For a gas bubble with a liquid wall, beyond which is again gas, there are two surfaces, each contributing to the total pressure difference. If the bubble is spherical and the outer radius differs from the inner radius by a small distance, $R_o=R_i+d$, the difference in pressure between the outer and inner regions of gas is $\Delta P=\Delta P_i+\Delta P_o=2\gamma\left(\frac{1}{R_i}+\frac{1}{R_i+d}\right)= \frac{4\gamma}{R_i}\left(1-\frac{1}{2}\frac{d}{R_i+d}\right)\approx\frac{4\gamma}{R_i}+\mathcal{O}(d).$

== Examples ==
A common example of use is finding the pressure inside an air bubble in pure water, where $\gamma$ = 72 mN/m at 25 °C (298 K). The extra pressure inside the bubble is given here for three bubble sizes:

| Bubble diameter (2r) (μm) | $\Delta P$ (Pa) | $\Delta P$ (atm) |
|---|---|---|
| 1000 | 288 | 0.00284 |
| 3.0 | 96000 | 0.947 |
| 0.3 | 960000 | 9.474 |

A 1 mm bubble has negligible extra pressure. Yet when the diameter is ~3 μm, the bubble has an extra atmosphere inside than outside. When the bubble is only several hundred nanometers, the pressure inside can be several atmospheres. One should bear in mind that the surface tension in the numerator can be much smaller in the presence of surfactants or contaminants. The same calculation can be done for small oil droplets in water, where even in the presence of surfactants and a fairly low interfacial tension $\gamma$ = 5–10 mN/m, the pressure inside 100 nm diameter droplets can reach several atmospheres.

== See also ==
- Ostwald ripening
- Kelvin equation
- Laplace number
- Two-balloon experiment
