= Tolman length =

The Tolman length $\delta$ (also known as Tolman's delta) measures the extent by which the surface tension of a small liquid drop deviates from its planar value. It is conveniently defined in terms of an expansion in $1/R$, with $R=R_{e}$ the equimolar radius (defined below) of the liquid drop, of the pressure difference across the droplet's surface:

$\Delta p = \frac{2 \sigma}{R}\left(1-\frac{\delta}{R}+\ldots\right)$ (1)

In this expression, $\Delta p = p_{l}-p_{v}$ is the pressure difference between the (bulk) pressure of the liquid inside and the pressure of the vapour outside, and $\sigma$ is the surface tension of the planar interface, i.e. the interface with zero curvature $R=\infty$. The Tolman length $\delta$ is thus defined as the leading order correction in an expansion in $1/R$.

The equimolar radius is defined so that the superficial density is zero, i.e., it is defined by imagining a sharp mathematical dividing surface with a uniform internal and external density, but where the total mass of the pure fluid is exactly equal to the real situation. At the atomic scale in a real drop, the surface is not sharp, rather the density gradually drops to zero, and the Tolman length captures the fact that the idealized equimolar surface does not necessarily coincide with the idealized tension surface.

Another way to define the Tolman length is to consider the radius dependence of the surface tension, $\sigma(R)$. To leading order in $1/R$ one has:

$\sigma(R)=\sigma \left(1-\frac{2\delta}{R}+\ldots \right)$ (2)

Here $\sigma(R)$ denotes the surface tension (or (excess) surface free energy) of a liquid drop with radius $R$, whereas $\sigma$ denotes its value in the planar limit.

In both definitions (1) and (2) the Tolman length is defined as a coefficient in an expansion in $1/R$ and therefore does not depend on $R$.

Furthermore, the Tolman length can be related to the radius of spontaneous curvature when one compares the free energy method of Helfrich with the method of Tolman:

$$\delta\sigma=\frac{2k}{R_{0}}$$

Any result for the Tolman length therefore gives information about the radius of spontaneous curvature, $R_{0}$. If the Tolman length is known to be positive (with $k > 0$) the interface tends to curve towards the liquid phase, whereas a negative Tolman length implies a negative $R_{0}$ and a preferred curvature towards the vapour phase.

Apart from being related to the radius of spontaneous curvature, the Tolman length can be linked to the surface of tension. The surface of tension, positioned at $R=R_{s}$, is defined as the surface for which the Young–Laplace equation holds exactly for all droplet radii:

$$\Delta p=\frac{2\sigma_{s}}{R_{s}} \iff \frac{\partial \sigma_{s}}{\partial R} = 0$$

where $\sigma_{s}=\sigma(R=R_{s})$ is the surface tension at the surface of tension. Using the Gibbs adsorption equation, Tolman himself showed that the Tolman length can be expressed in terms of the adsorbed amount at the surface of tension at coexistence

$$\delta =\frac{\Gamma_{s}}{\Delta \rho_{0}}$$

where $\Delta \rho_{0}=\rho_{l,0}-\rho_{v,0}$; the subscript zero to the density denotes the value at two-phase coexistence. It can be shown that the difference between the location of the surface of tension and of the equimolar dividing surface proposed by Gibbs yields the value of the Tolman length:

$$\delta=\lim_{R_{s}\rightarrow \infty}(R_{e}-R_{s})=z_{e}-z_{s}$$

where the $z_{e},z_{s}$ denote the locations of the corresponding surfaces making the magnitude of the Tolman length in the order of nanometers.
