= Stalagmometric method =

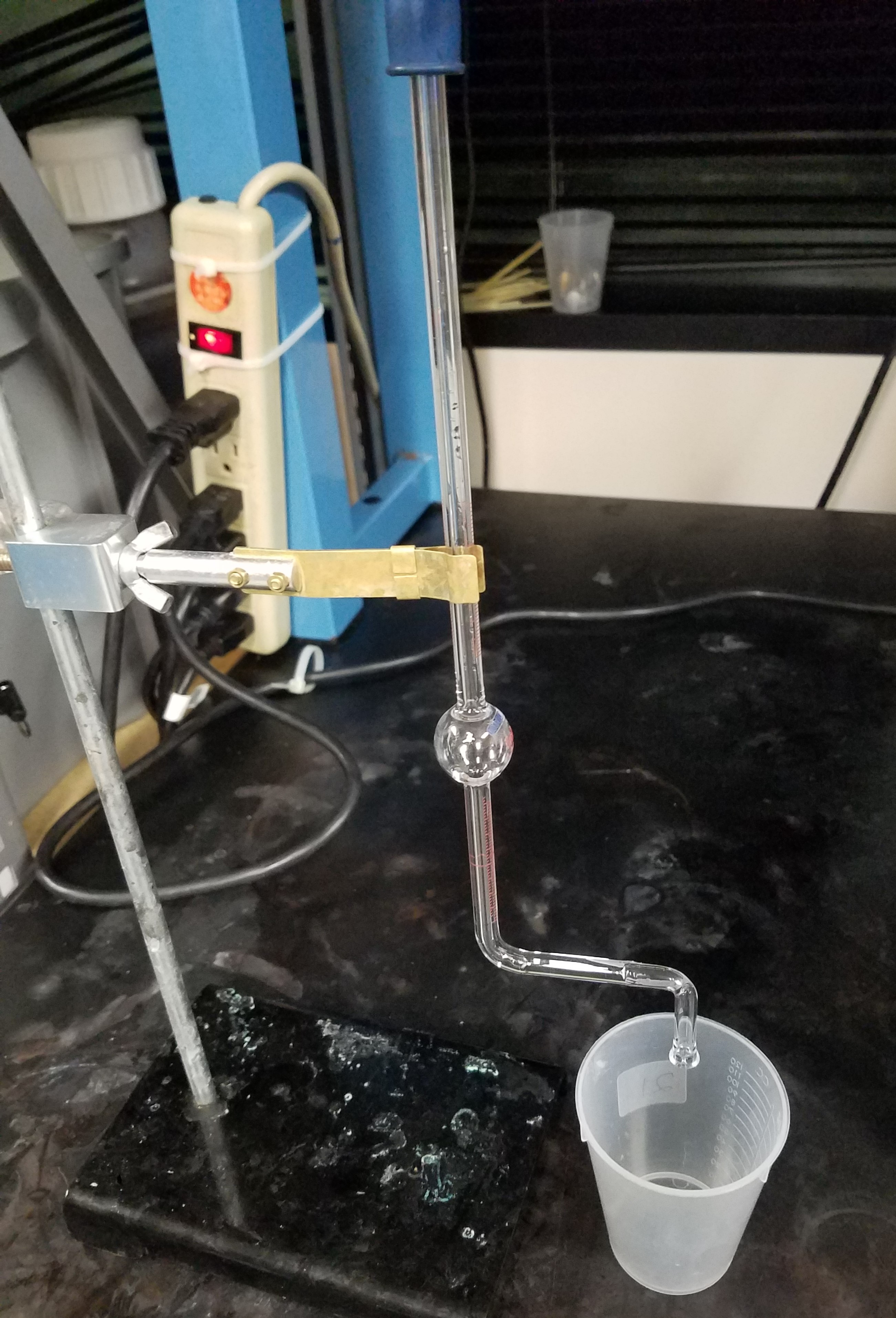
Stalagmometer setup on a ring stand

The stalagmometric method (Ancient Greek: στάλαγμα, romanized: stálagma, lit. 'drop') is one of the most common methods for measuring surface tension. The principle is to measure the weight of drops of a fluid of interest falling from a capillary glass tube, and thereby calculate the surface tension of the fluid. We can determine the weight of the falling drops by counting them. From it we can determine the surface tension.

== Stalagmometer ==
A stalagmometer, straight form.

A stalagmometer is a device for investigating surface tension using the stalagmometric method. It is also called a stactometer or stalogometer. The device is a capillary glass tube whose middle section is widened. The volume of a drop can be predetermined by the design of the stalagmometer. The lower end of the tube is narrowed to force the fluid to fall out of the tube as a drop. In an experiment, the drops of fluid flow slowly from the tube in a vertical direction. The drops hanging on the bottom of the tube start to fall when the volume of the drop reaches a maximum value that is dependent on the characteristics of the solution. At this moment, the weight of the drops is in equilibrium state with the surface tension. Based on Tate’s law:

$\ mg=2\pi r \sigma$

The drop falls when the weight (mg) is equal to the circumference (2πr) multiplied by the surface tension (σ). The surface tension can be calculated provided the radius of the tube (r) and mass of the fluid droplet (m) are known. Alternatively, since the surface tension is proportional to the weight of the drop, the fluid of interest may be compared to a reference fluid of known surface tension (typically water):

$\frac {m_1}{\sigma_1}=\frac {m_2}{\sigma_2}$

In the equation, m_{1} and σ_{1} represent the mass and surface tension of the reference fluid and m_{2} and σ_{2} the mass and surface tension of the fluid of interest. If we take water as a reference fluid,

$\sigma=\sigma_{H_2O}\times\frac {m}{m_{H_2O}}$

If the surface tension of water is known which is 72 dyne/cm, we can calculate the surface tension of the specific fluid from the equation. The more drops we weigh, the more precisely we can calculate the surface tension from the equation. The stalagmometer must be kept clean for meaningful readings. There are commercial tubes for stalagmometric method in three sizes: 2.5, 3.5, and 5.0 (mL). The 2.5-mL size is suitable for small volumes and low viscosity, that of 3.5 (mL) for relatively viscous fluids, and that of 5.0 (mL) for large volumes and high viscosity. The 2.5-mL size is suitable for most fluids.

== Modified method ==
The stalagmometric method was improved by S. V. Chichkanov and colleagues, who measured the weight of a fixed number of drops rather than counting the drops. This method for determining the surface tension may be more precise than the original method, especially for fluids whose surface is highly active.
