= Phospholipidosis =

Lysosomal storage disorder

Phospholipidosis is a lysosomal storage disorder characterized by the excessive accumulation of phospholipids in tissues. Certain cases may be triggered by medications. Phospholipidosis is also the leading theory for the connection between certain pulse- and pea-rich diets and dilated cardiomyopathy in dogs.

The traditional method to evaluate drug-induced phospholipidosis (DIPL) is visual confirmation of myeloid bodies in tissues by electron microscopy. Electron microscopy has limited utility to monitor DIPL in humans because of the invasive nature of acquiring patient tissue biopsy samples. A qualified biomarker of DIPL in the blood or urine is needed to provide a more routine, non-invasive, and cost effective means to monitor DIPL in the clinic.
