= Electrodipping force =

The electrodipping force is a force proposed to explain the observed attraction that arises among small colloidal particles attached to an interface between immiscible liquids. The particles are held there by surface tension. Normally the surface tension does not in itself give rise to an attraction or repulsion among particles on a meniscus. A capillary interaction requires that the particles are pushed or pulled away from the meniscus, for instance because of their weight, if the particles are large and heavy enough.

It has been proposed by Nikolaides et al. that the observed attractions are the result of an electrostatic pressure on the liquid interface, due to electric charges on the particles. The electrostatic pressure arises because the dielectric constants of the liquids differ. Due to the pressure, the liquid interface deforms. This pressure is balanced by a simultaneous electrostatic force acting on the charges, and hence on the particle itself. The force has been coined the electrodipping force by Kralchevsky et al. - it dips the particle in one of the liquids.

According to Nikolaides, the electrostatic force engenders a long range capillary attraction. However, this explanation is controversial; other authors have argued that the capillary effect of the electrodipping force is in fact cancelled by the electrostatic pressure on the interface, so the resulting capillary effect would be insignificant.
