= Spinning drop method =

Method used to measure interfacial tension

The spinning drop method or rotating drop method is one of the methods used to measure interfacial tension. Measurements are carried out in a rotating horizontal tube which contains a dense fluid. A drop of a less dense liquid or a gas bubble is placed inside the fluid. Since the rotation of the horizontal tube creates a centrifugal force towards the tube walls, the liquid drop will start to deform into an elongated shape; this elongation stops when the interfacial tension and centrifugal forces are balanced. The surface tension between the two liquids (for bubbles: between the fluid and the gas) can then be derived from the shape of the drop at this equilibrium point. A device used for such measurements is called a “spinning drop tensiometer”.

The spinning drop method is usually preferred for the accurate measurements of surface tensions below 10^{−2} mN/m. It refers to either using the fluids with low interfacial tension or working at very high angular velocities. This method is widely used in many different applications such as measuring the interfacial tension of polymer blends and copolymers.

== Theory ==
An approximate theory was developed by Bernard Vonnegut in 1942 to measure the surface tension of the fluids, which is based on the principle that the interfacial tension and centrifugal forces are balanced at mechanical equilibrium. This theory assumes that the droplet's length L is much greater than its radius R, so that it may be approximated as a straight circular cylinder.

The relation between the surface tension and angular velocity of a droplet can be obtained in different ways. One of them involves considering the total mechanical energy of the droplet as the summation of its kinetic energy and its surface energy:

$$E=E_k +\gamma_s$$

The kinetic energy of a cylinder of length L and radius R rotating about its central axis is given by

$$E_k=\frac{1}{2}I\omega^2=\frac{1}{4}mR^2\omega^2$$

in which

$$I=\frac{1}{2}mR^2$$

is the moment of inertia of a cylinder rotating about its central axis and ω is its angular velocity. The surface energy of the droplet is given by

$$\gamma_s=2\pi LR\sigma=\frac{2V}{R}\sigma$$

in which V is the constant volume of the droplet and σ is the interfacial tension. Then the total mechanical energy of the droplet is

$$E=E_k +\gamma_s=\frac{1}{4}\Delta\rho VR^2\omega^2+\frac{2V}{R}\sigma$$

in which Δρ is the difference between the densities of the droplet and of the surrounding fluid. At mechanical equilibrium, the mechanical energy is minimized, and thus

$$\frac{dE}{dR}=0=\frac{1}{2}\Delta\rho VR\omega^2-\frac{2V}{R^2}\sigma$$

Substituting in

$$V=\pi LR^2$$

for a cylinder and then solving this relation for interfacial tension yields

$$\sigma=\frac{\Delta\rho\omega^2}{4}R^3$$

This equation is known as Vonnegut’s expression. Interfacial tension of any liquid that gives a shape very close to a cylinder at steady state, can be estimated using this equation. The straight cylindrical shape will always develop for sufficiently high ω; this typically happens for L/R > 4. Once this shape has developed, further increasing ω will decrease R while increasing L keeping LR^{2} fixed to meet conservation of volume.

== New developments after 1942 ==
The full mathematical analysis on the shape of spinning drops was done by Princen and others. Progress in numerical algorithms and available computing resources turned solving the non linear implicit parameter equations to a pretty much 'common' task, which has been tackled by various authors and companies. The results are proving the Vonnegut restriction is no longer valid for the spinning drop method.

== Comparison with other methods ==
The spinning drop method is convenient compared to other widely used methods for obtaining interfacial tension, because contact angle measurement is not required. Another advantage of the spinning drop method is that it is not necessary to estimate the curvature at the interface, which entails complexities associated with shape of the fluid drop.

On the other hand, this theory suggested by Vonnegut, is restricted with the rotational velocity. The spinning drop method is not expected to give accurate results for high surface tension measurements, since the centrifugal force that is required to maintain the drop in a cylindrical shape is much higher in the case of liquids that have high interfacial tensions.
