= Por =

Por or POR may refer to:

== Por ==
- Por (Thai word)
- Por, Armenia, a town
- Por, a Spanish preposition
- Por, a Portuguese preposition

== POR ==
- POR (gene), cytochrome P450 reductase
- Portugal, IOC country code
- Power-on reset
- Program of Record (PoR), a term used in US government procurement
- The Policy, Organisation and Rules of The Scout Association in the United Kingdom

== Politics ==
- Partido Obrero Revolucionario (disambiguation), commonly referred to by the Spanish initials POR
- Party of the Right (disambiguation), any of several organizations

== Places ==
- Portland Transportation Center, US, Amtrak station code
- Pori Airport, Finland; IATA airport code
- Porth railway station, Wales; National Rail station code

== Other uses ==
- Portland Trail Blazers, a National Basketball Association team that uses this abbreviation for box scores and television scoring displays

== See also ==
- Poor (disambiguation)
- Pore (disambiguation)
