= Poor (disambiguation) =

Poor is an adjective related to a state of poverty.

Poor or The poor may also refer to:

== Places ==
- Pur, Iran (Persian: پور, also romanized as poor), a village in Hormozgan Province, Iran
- Poor Mountain, a mountain in Virginia
- Poor Valley, a valley in Tennessee and Virginia

== People with the name ==
- Charles Henry Poor (1808–1882), a United States Navy officer
- Charles Lane Poor (1866–1951), an American astronomer
- Edward Erie Poor (1837–1900), an American banker, president of the National Park Bank
- Enoch Poor (1736–1780), an American general in the American Revolutionary War
- Henry Poor (disambiguation), various people
- Janet Meakin Poor (1929–2017), an American landscape design specialist from Winnetka, Illinois
- John A. Poor (1808–1871), an American lawyer, editor, and railroad entrepreneur
- Salem Poor (1747–1802), an African-American slave and American Revolutionary War soldier
- Sophia Poor (born 2006), English association footballer

== Music ==
- The Poor (American band), American rock band
- The Poor (Australian band), Australian rock band

== See also ==
- Poor Boy (disambiguation)
- Poore, a surname
- Por (disambiguation)
- Pore (disambiguation)
- Poverty (disambiguation)
