= Pour =

Pour is a name which can be used as a surname and a given name:

- Kour Pour (born 1987), American artist of Iranian and British descent
- Mehdi Niyayesh Pour (born 1992), Iranian footballer
- Mojtaba Mobini Pour (born 1991), Iranian footballer
- Pouya Jalili Pour (born 1976), Iranian singer residing in the United States
- Pour Lui (born 1990), Japanese singer

== See also ==
- Pouring
- Decantation, a method of pouring that can be used to remove sediment
- Pur, Iran, a village in Hormozgan Province, Iran
- Mohammad Pour Rahmatollah (born 1995), Iranian footballer
- Rahim Pour-Azghandi, (born 1964/65), Iranian scholar and politician
- Sirous Pour Mousavi (born 1971), Iranian football coach
- Mohammad-Reza Pour-Mohammadi (born 1958), President of Tabriz University, Iran
- Mostafa Pour-Mohammadi (born 1960), Iranian prosecutor and politician
- Pour Lui (disambiguation)
- Pour Me (disambiguation)
