= WDE =

WDE may refer to:

- Water droplet erosion
- An abbreviation of War (Damn) Eagle, the battle cry of Auburn University
- Weak-side Defensive end, a position in American football
- Wood End railway station (National Rail station code: WDE), a railway station in Stratford-upon-Avon, Warwickshire, England
- Edsall Class (WDE) A designation of U. S. Coast Guard Cutters
