= Pore =

Pore may refer to:

== Biology ==
=== Animal biology and microbiology ===
- Sweat pore, an anatomical structure of the skin of humans (and other mammals) used for secretion of sweat
- Hair follicle, an anatomical structure of the skin of humans (and other mammals) used for secretion of sebum
- Canal pore, an anatomical structure that is part of the lateral line sensory system of some aquatic organisms
- Gonopore, a genital pore present in some invertebrates, particularly insects
- Ozopore, the external discharge site of defensive glands in millipedes and some arachnids
- An opening across both inner and outer bacterial membranes, a part of many Gram-negative bacterial secretion systems
- One of the openings communicating with the skin surface at the terminus of lactiferous ducts in milk-producing mammals

=== Plant and fungal biology ===
- Germ pore, a small pore in the outer wall of a fungal spore through which the germ tube exits upon germination
- Stoma, a small opening on a plant leaf used for gas exchange
- An anatomical feature of the anther in some plant species, the opening through which pollen is released
- A characteristic surface feature of porate pollen
- An opening in a poricidal fruit capsule

=== Cell and molecular biology ===
- Nuclear pore, a large protein complex that penetrates the nuclear envelope in eukaryotic cells
- Ion channel pore, the ion-selective opening in the membrane of a eukaryotic cell formed by members of the ion channel family of proteins
- A water-selective opening (water channel) in the membrane of a eukaryotic cell formed by assemblies of the protein aquaporin

== People ==
=== Given name ===
- Pore Mosulishvili (1918–1944), decorated Soviet soldier during World War II

=== Family name ===
- Ryan Pore (born 1983), American soccer player
- Daniel Alolga Akata Pore, Ghanaian politician

== Physical sciences ==
- Pore (material), one of many small openings in a solid substance of any kind that contribute to the substance's porosity (typical usage in earth sciences, materials science and construction)
- A small defect in the crystal structure that may arise during sintering to form solids from powders, including ceramics
- Pore (bread), an air pocket in bread
- Pore space in soil, the liquid and gas phases of soil
- Void (composites), a pore that remains unoccupied in a composite material
- Solar pore, a newly forming sunspot without a penumbra

== Places ==
- Partap Pore, a village in the Leh district of Ladakh, India
- Pig-poré, a village in Burkina Faso
- Pore, Casanare, a town and municipality in the Department of Casanare, Colombia

== Other uses ==
- P.O.R.E. (Partido Obrero Revolucionario de España), the Revolutionary Workers' Party of Spain

== See also ==
- Poor (disambiguation)
- Poore
- Por (disambiguation)
- Pour (disambiguation)
