= Poore =

Poore is a surname, and may refer to:

== People ==
- Benjamin Perley Poore (1820–1870), American journalist
- Dennis Poore (1916–1987), British businessman
- Henry Rankin Poore (1859–1940), American artist and author
- Herbert Poore (died 1217), English cleric
- Kimberly Poore Moser (born 1962), American politician
- Matt Poore (1930–2020), cricketer
- Nina Douglas-Hamilton, Duchess of Hamilton (1878–1948), born Nina Mary Benita Poore
- Richard Poore (died 1237), English cleric at Salisbury
- Robert Poore (1866–1938), English cricketer

== See also ==
- Poore Baronets
- Poor (disambiguation)
- Pore (disambiguation)
