= Milk Drop Coronet =

1957 photograph by Harold Edgerton

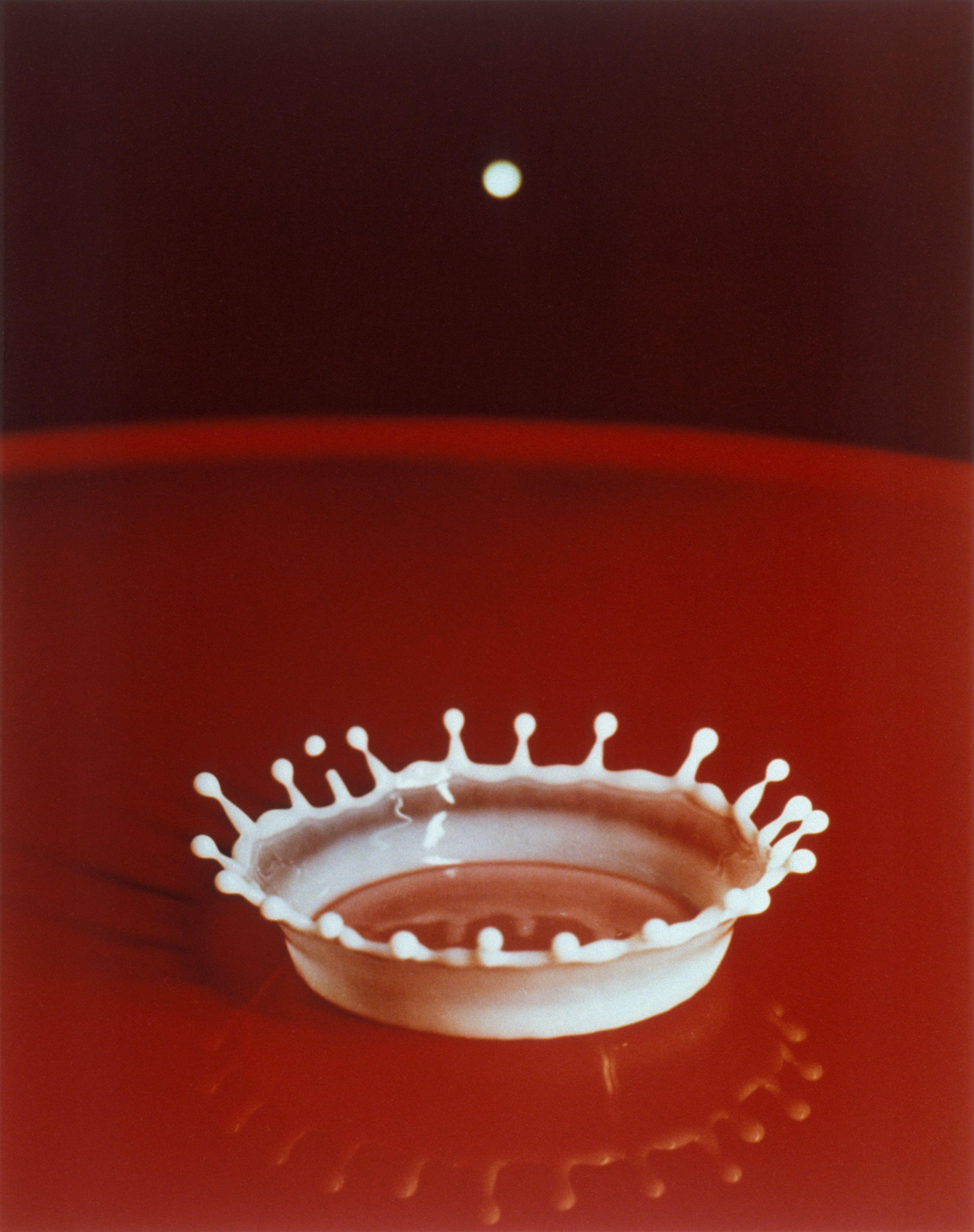
- Scan of a dye-transfer print at the MIT Museum
- Artist: Harold Edgerton
- Completion date: January 10, 1957
- Medium: Kodak Panatomic X and Ektacolor
- Subject: Drop of milk
- Location: MIT Museum, Original negative destroyed; see Milk Drop Coronet § Physical copies for locations of copies

Milk Drop Coronet is a high-speed photograph of a drop of milk falling onto the surface of a red pan, creating a splash resembling a coronet, taken by American scientist Harold "Doc" Edgerton on January 10, 1957. The picture was created using a camera connected to a beam of light, which triggered when the drop of milk obstructed the light.

Edgerton was an electrical engineer, and had personally developed a stroboscope which he used to take high-speed photographs of, among others, drops of liquid. He began capturing images of milk drops as early as 1932, and produced a similar picture to Milk Drop Coronet titled Milk Drop Coronet Splash in 1936.

Milk Drop Coronet has been called an "uncannily beautiful image" by New York Times art critic Ken Johnson, appeared in Time magazine's list of Most Influential Images of All Time, and exhibited in various art museums.

== Background ==
Harold Eugene Edgerton was an American photographer and scientist who earned a PhD at the Massachusetts Institute of Technology in 1931, where he served as a professor of electrical engineering. In 1932, Edgerton designed a stroboscope that could emit 60 10‐microsecond flashes of light per second and recharge in less than a microsecond, which could thus be used to take high-speed photographs. Edgerton, who initially intended to use the stroboscope to study electrical motors, extended his efforts to photos of bullets being shot, flying insects, and drops of liquid. Edgerton had begun making photographs of drops of milk splashing as early as 1932, and four years later, he created a black-and-white photograph, titled Milk Drop Coronet Splash, of a splash of milk forming a coronal shape, similar to Milk Drop Coronet. In the second edition of his 1939 book Flash! Seeing the Unseen by Ultra High-Speed Photography, Edgerton wrote that two principles should be kept in mind when viewing his photographs of splashes and drops:

First, the behavior of liquids is affected by surface tension. The surface layers of any liquid act like a stretched skin or membrane (a drumhead, for example) which is always trying to contract and diminish its area. Second, a spout or column of liquid, beyond a certain length in relation to its diameter, is unstable and tends to break down into a series of equidistant drops. As these drops are formed, they are joined together by narrow necks of liquid which in turn break up into smaller drops.

— Edgerton, Flash! Seeing the Unseen by Ultra High-Speed Photography, p. 107

== Creation ==
On the same day it was made, Edgerton detailed his process for creating the photograph in his notebook.

The photograph was created on January 10, 1957. Milk was selected for its high contrast and its opacity. Edgerton connected his camera to xenon flashtubes, then positioned it in front of a dripper that steadily released droplets onto a red pan. The photo was taken when the first drop fell through and thereby briefly blocked a beam of light connected to a detector. This first drop is seen in the photograph as forming the splash, under a second drop falling.

== Physical copies ==
According to Gus Kayafas, the original photographic negative was destroyed. Several prints of the photograph have been made, which were distributed to and exhibited in art museums.

Date printed	Medium	Dimensions (image)	Location	Ref.
1957	Dye transfer	46.7 centimetres (18.4 in) × 33.9 centimetres (13.3 in)	Art Institute of Chicago	
1957	Dye transfer	—N/a	MIT Museum	
1957	Dye transfer	46.5 centimetres (18.3 in) × 33.8 centimetres (13.3 in)	Denver Art Museum	
1957	C-type	25.4 centimetres (10.0 in) × 19.2 centimetres (7.6 in)	Amon Carter Museum of American Art	
1957	Dye transfer	50.5 centimetres (19.9 in) × 40.64 centimetres (16.00 in)	San Francisco Museum of Modern Art	
1957	Dye transfer	46.5 centimetres (18.3 in) × 33.8 centimetres (13.3 in)	Philadelphia Museum of Art	
1957	Dye transfer	—N/a	Museum of Fine Arts (St. Petersburg, Florida)	
1957	Dye transfer	47 centimetres (19 in) × 33.7 centimetres (13.3 in)	New Mexico Museum of Art	
1957	Dye transfer	46.5 centimetres (18.3 in) × 34 centimetres (13 in)	Harvard Art Museums	
After 1957	C-type	54 centimetres (21 in) × 34.5 centimetres (13.6 in)	Victoria and Albert Museum	
After 1957	Dye transfer	35.6 centimetres (14.0 in) × 27.9 centimetres (11.0 in)	The Phillips Collection	
1963	Dye transfer	24.8 centimetres (9.8 in) × 20 centimetres (7.9 in)	Museum of Modern Art	
1977	Dye transfer	35.4 centimetres (13.9 in) × 28 centimetres (11 in)	National Gallery of Canada	
1985	Dye transfer	46.7 centimetres (18.4 in) × 34.2 centimetres (13.5 in)	Princeton University Art Museum	
1984–1990	Dye transfer	46.7 centimetres (18.4 in) × 34 centimetres (13 in)	Whitney Museum	

== Reception and legacy ==
Art critic Ken Johnson, writing for The New York Times in 2001, called the photograph an "uncannily beautiful image" and compared Edgerton's work to Eadweard Muybridge's photography. In 2016, the photograph was included in Time magazine's 100 Photographs: The Most Influential Images of All Time. The corresponding article read that the picture "proved that photography could advance human understanding of the physical world."

Mathematicians Martin Golubitsky and Ian Stewart used the photograph to illustrate the phenomenon of symmetry-breaking in their 1992 book Fearful symmetry: is God a geometer?

== See also ==
- List of photographs considered the most important
