= Poverty (disambiguation) =

Poverty is the scarcity or the lack of certain (variant) material possessions, and may include social, economic, or political elements.

Poverty may also refer to:

== Places ==
- Poverty, Kentucky, an unincorporated community
- Poverty Bay, a bay on New Zealand's North Island
- Poverty Hills, California, a mountain range
- Poverty Island, a small island in Lake Michigan

== Music ==
- Poverty (rapper) (b. 1978)
- Poverty's Paradise, a 1995 album by Naughty By Nature
- Two (Poverty), 2007 album by Demiricous

== In philosophy ==
Poverty meaning weakness of argument is a common theme in philosophy, for example:

- Pierre-Joseph Proudhon's The Philosophy of Poverty
- Karl Marx's The Poverty of Philosophy
- Karl Popper's The Poverty of Historicism

== See also ==
- Poor (disambiguation)
