= Party of the Right =

Party of the Right may refer to:

- Party of the Right (Luxembourg), a defunct conservative party (1914–1944)
- Party of Rights, a Croatian political party (1861–1929)
- The Party of the Right, an intellectual, fraternal, and political society, functioning as a landed brotherhood, which holds debates and participates in the Yale Political Union
