= Pour Me =

Pour Me may refer to:

- "Pour Me" (Trick Pony song)
- "Pour Me", a b-side to the Coldplay single "Fix You"
- "Pour Me", a song by Hollywood Undead on the 2011 album American Tragedy
