= Pouring =

Act of tilting a container with liquid

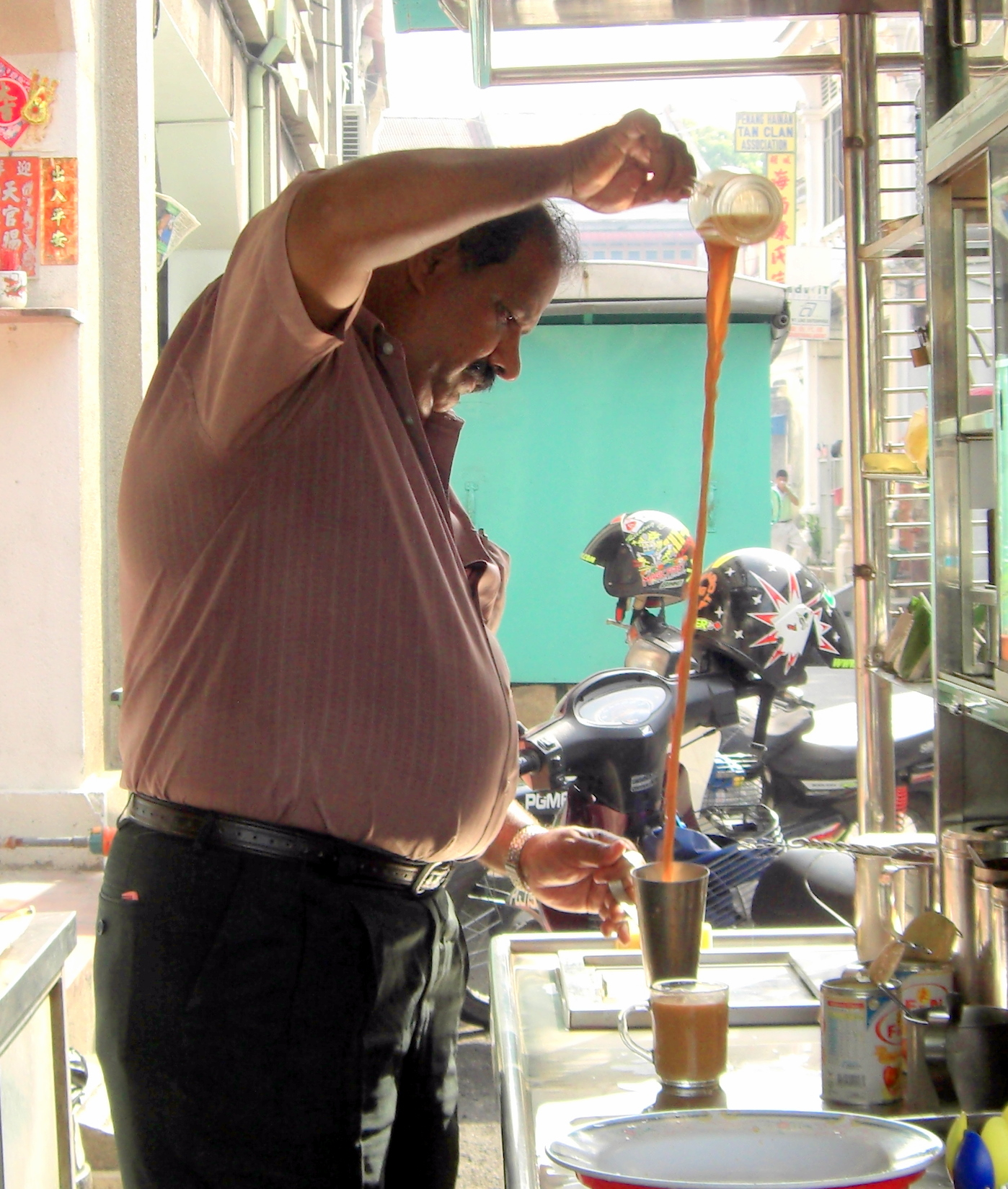
Preparation of teh tarik involves pouring the tea at great height from one container to another repeatedly

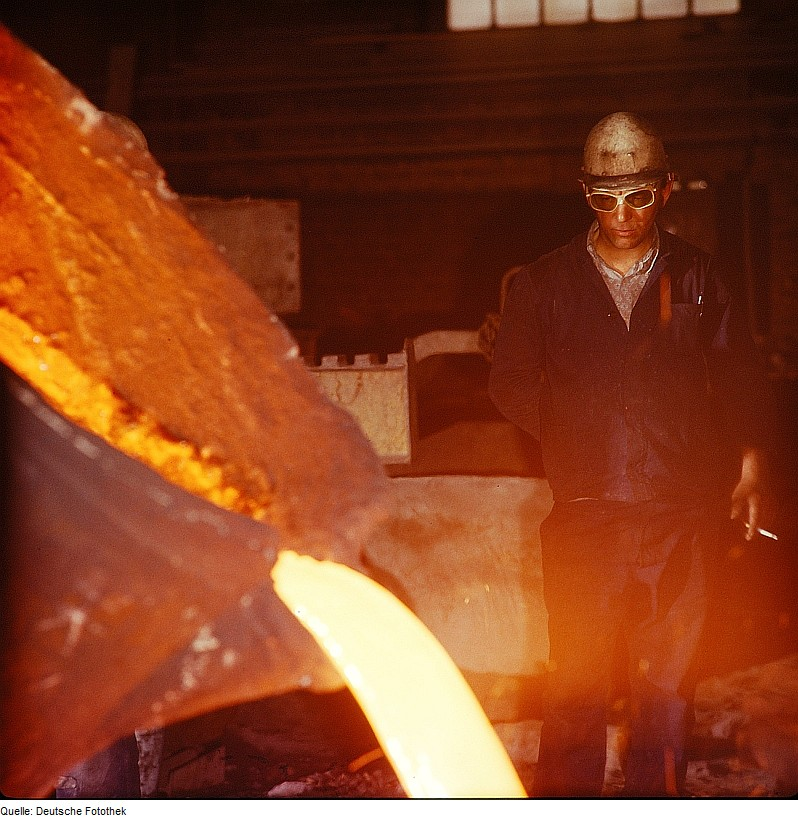
A foundry worker watching molten metal being poured out

Pouring is the act of tilting an open container which has liquid or bulk flowable solid inside of it, to cause the contents to flow out of the container under the influence of gravity. This may be done to move the contents to another container (such as pouring a shared drink from a bottle into individual cups), to coat a surface with the contents (as in pouring a syrup onto solid food, or the artistic technique of paint pouring), or simply to empty the original container.

== Physical aspects ==
When a liquid is poured from one container to another, various parameters such as the speed of pouring, the distance between the source and destination containers, vibration, and the rate of heat transfer to or from the environment, may cause changes in the liquid being poured. Depending on context, these changes may be desirable or undesirable. For example, in the preparation of Malaysian-style teh tarik 'pulled tea', the brewed tea mixed with milk is poured back and forth between two containers at an increasing distance in order to create a foam and to cool the tea. In contrast, in industrial processes such as casting where a molten metal is poured into a mould, the pouring process can induce the creation of bifilms (doubly-oxidated surfaces folded over on each other) which lead to further defects in the final cast part.

The difficulty of controlling all the variables when pouring purely by hand, along with the potential danger to people in the vicinity from splashing of hot liquid, has led to the development of automated pouring equipment for use in industrial settings. There has also been research in robotics to develop robots which can pour drinks and granular ingredients such as sugar. Systems for pouring face unique difficulties compared to other cases of robots manipulating physical objects: contact sensors cannot be attached directly to liquids, so measuring parameters of pouring, such as vibration and the amount of liquid which has been poured, may require the use of computer vision techniques.

== Cultural aspects ==
The metaphor of "pouring prayers" appears in Sanskrit, Latin, and Ancient Greek poetry, in reference to the literal pouring out of a drink onto the ground or over an icon as an offering in a libation.

== See also ==
- Teapot effect, when a liquid being poured from a container runs down the spout or the body of the vessel instead of flowing out in an arc
- Decantation, a process for separating a liquid from another liquid or a solid by pouring it into a separate container
- Bulk material handling

== Works cited ==
- Vanden-Broeck, Jean-Marc; Keller, Joseph B. (1986). "Pouring flows". Phys. Fluids. 29 (12): 3958–3961. Bibcode:1986PhFl...29.3958V. doi:10.1063/1.865735.
- Davis, Ernest (August 2008). "Pouring liquids: A study in commonsense physical reasoning" (PDF). Artificial Intelligence. 172 (12–13): 1540–1578. doi:10.1016/j.artint.2008.04.003.
- VanEver, Amanda (2019). The Art of Paint Pouring: Tips, techniques, and step-by-step instructions for creating colorful poured art in acrylic. Walter Foster Publishing. ISBN 9781633227378.
- Kurke, L. (1989). "Pouring Prayers: A Formula of IE Sacral Poetry". Journal of Indo-European Studies. 17 (1–2): 113–125.
- Lateiner, Donald (March 2002). "Pouring Bloody Drops (Iliad 16.459): The Grief of Zeus". Colby Quarterly. 38 (1).
- Campbell, J. (2012). "Stop Pouring, Start Casting". International Journal of Metalcasting. 6 (3): 7–18. doi:10.1007/BF03355529. S2CID 138059264.
- Li, Long; Wang, Chengjun; Wu, Hongtao (2018). "Research on Kinematics and Pouring Law of a Mobile Heavy Load Pouring Robot". Mathematical Problems in Engineering. 2018: 1–13. doi:10.1155/2018/8790575.
- Yamaguchi, Akihiko; Atkeson, Christopher G.; Niekum, Scott; Ogasawara, Tsukasa (2014). "Learning pouring skills from demonstration and practice" (PDF). 2014 IEEE-RAS International Conference on Humanoid Robots. pp. 908–915. doi:10.1109/HUMANOIDS.2014.7041472. ISBN 978-1-4799-7174-9. S2CID 740328.
- Huang, Yongqiang; Wilches, Juan; Sun, Yu (February 2021). "Robot gaining accurate pouring skills through self-supervised learning and generalization". Robotics and Autonomous Systems. 136 103692. arXiv:2011.10150. doi:10.1016/j.robot.2020.103692.
- Tan, Bonny (2013). "Teh tarik". Singapore: National Library Board. Archived from the original on 2022-12-28.
- Schenck, Connor; Fox, Dieter (2017). "Visual closed-loop control for pouring liquids". 2017 IEEE International Conference on Robotics and Automation (ICRA). pp. 2629–2636. arXiv:1610.02610. doi:10.1109/ICRA.2017.7989307. ISBN 978-1-5090-4633-1. S2CID 534730.
- Zhu, Hairui; Yamakawa, Yuji (2022). "Robotic Pouring Based on Real-Time Observation and Visual Feedback by a High-Speed Vision System". Journal of Robotics and Mechatronics. 34 (5): 965–974. doi:10.20965/jrm.2022.p0965.
