= Partido Obrero Revolucionario =

Partido Obrero Revolucionario (Spanish, 'Revolutionary Workers' Party') may refer to:

- Revolutionary Workers' Party (Bolivia)
- Revolutionary Workers' Party (Peru)
- Revolutionary Workers' Party (Spain)
- Revolutionary Workers' Party (Uruguay)

== See also ==
- Revolutionary Workers Party (disambiguation)
