= Pour Lui (disambiguation) =

Pour Lui (born 1990) is a Japanese singer.

Pour Lui may also refer to:

- Pour Lui (Ajda Pekkan album), 1978 Ajda Pekkan album.
- Oscar De La Renta Pour Lui, a fragrance recognised by the FiFi Awards
