= Water droplet erosion =

Form of materials wear

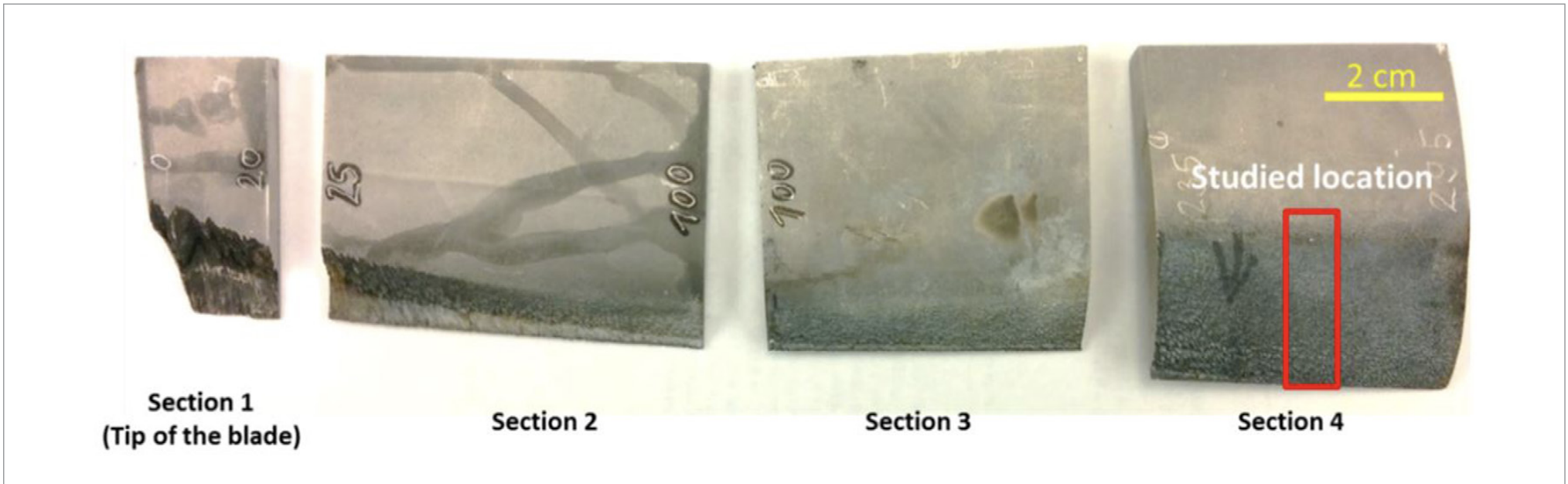
Water droplet erosion damage in a steam turbine blade

Water droplet erosion (WDE) is "a form of materials wear that is caused by the impact of liquid droplets with sufficiently high speed." The phenomenon was furthermore previously known as liquid impingement erosion (LIE).

== Distinction from other phenomena ==
The emphasis of discrete water droplets serves to distinguish the WDE problem from liquid jet erosion and cavitation. The impact pressures invoked by discrete water droplet impact have a range considerably higher than the stagnation pressure created by liquid jet.

The difference between WDE and cavitation erosion is the fact that WDE usually comprises a gaseous or vaporous phase containing discrete liquid droplets; while cavitation erosion is observed when a continual liquid phase carries separate gaseous bubbles or cavities inside it.

Recently, Ibrahim & Medraj developed an analytical model to predict the threshold speed of water droplet erosion and verified it experimentally, a challenge having been attempted hitherto without success since the 1950s.

== Consequences ==
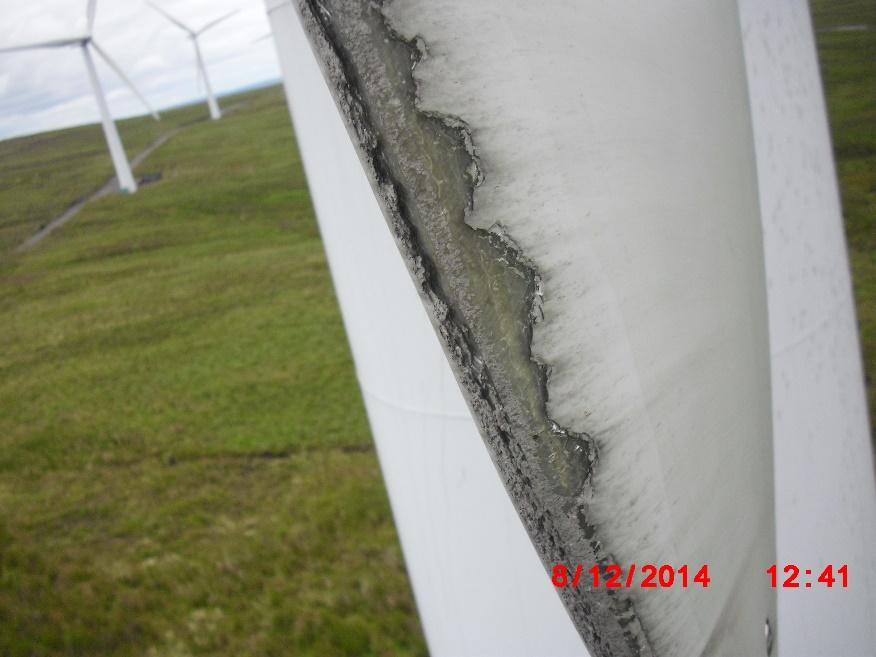
Water droplet erosion damage in wind turbines caused by rain

For an extended period of time, many industries have encountered the problem of erosion due to water droplet impact, and it continues to reappear wherever rotation or movement of a component at high speed in a hydrometer environment is employed. Recently, with the use of larger wind turbine blades, the issue of erosion of the leading edge due to rain droplets has grown more grave. Aerodynamics efficiency of turbine blades is severely diminished due to leading-edge erosion, resulting in a considerable decrease in annual energy production.
