= Henry Poor =

Henry Poor may refer to:

- Henry Varnum Poor (1812–1905), American financial analyst
- Henry Varnum Poor (designer) (1888–1970), American artist and designer
- Henry William Poor (1844–1915), American banker and stockbroker, son of financial analyst Henry Varnum Poor
- Henry Varnum Poor (Yale dean) (1914–1972), American politician and associate law school dean at Yale Law School

== See also ==
- Henry Rankin Poore (1859–1940), American painter and illustrator
