= Poor Boy =

Poor Boy may refer to:

- Poor Boy (film), a 2016 American Western film
- Poor Boy (Elvis Presley song), a 1956 song performed by Elvis Presley
- "Poor Boy" (Split Enz song), a 1980 song by Split Enz, covered in 1995 by ENZSO
- "Poor Boy (The Greenwood)", a 1974 song by Electric Light Orchestra
- "Poor Boy," a song from the David Byrne and Brian Eno album Everything That Happens Will Happen Today
- "Poor Boy," a song from the Nick Drake album Bryter Layter
- "Poor Boy", a song from the Belle and Sebastian EP How to Solve Our Human Problems (Part 3)
- Poor Boy, a 1969 album by Joe Bataan
- "Poor Boy, Minor Key," a song from the M. Ward album Transfiguration of Vincent
- Poor Boy Blues, the traditional blues song
- Poor Boy Blues, a song by Poison from Flesh & Blood
- Po' boy, a traditional sandwich common to New Orleans
- Po' Boy, a folk song by Burl Ives from a 1949 78 RPM album.
- Po' Boy (Bob Dylan song), a song by Bob Dylan from the 2001 album "Love & Theft"
- Poor boy - a boy who is in poverty
