= Terzaghi's principle =

Theory of soil consolidation and effective stress

Terzaghi's principle states that when stress is applied to a porous material (soil, concrete, rock and other porous media), it is opposed also by the fluid pressure filling the pores in the material.

Karl von Terzaghi introduced the idea in a series of papers in the 1920s based on his examination of building consolidation on soil. The principle states that all quantifiable changes in stress to a porous medium are a direct result of a change in effective stress. The effective stress, $\boldsymbol{\sigma}_{eff}$, is related to total stress, $\boldsymbol{\sigma}$, and the pore pressure, $P$, by

$$\boldsymbol{\sigma}_{eff} = \boldsymbol{\sigma} - P\mathbb{I}$$,

where $\mathbb I$ is the identity matrix. The negative sign is there because the pore pressure serves to lessen the volume-changing stress; physically this is because there is fluid in the pores which bears a part of the total stress, so partially unloading the solid matrix from normal stresses.

Terzaghi's principle applies well to porous materials whose solid constituents are incompressible - soil, for example, is composed of grains of incompressible silica so that the volume change in soil during consolidation is due solely to the rearrangement of these constituents with respect to one another. Generalizing Terzaghi's principle to include porous media (e.g., soil, rock, biological tissues, etc.) with compressible solid constituents was accomplished by Maurice Anthony Biot in the 1940s, giving birth to the theory of poroelasticity and poromechanics.

== Assumptions of Terzaghi's principle ==
1. The soil is homogenous (uniform in composition throughout) and isotropic (show same physical property in each direction).
2. The soil is fully saturated (zero air voids due to water content being so high).
3. The solid particles are incompressible.
4. Compression and flow are one-dimensional (vertical axis being the one of interest).
5. Strains in the soil are relatively small.
6. Darcy's law is valid for all hydraulic gradients.
7. The coefficient of permeability and the coefficient of volume compressibility remain constant throughout the process.
8. There is a unique relationship, independent of time, between the void ratio and effective stress

== Validity ==
Though the first five assumptions are either likely to hold, or deviation will have no discernible effect, experimental results contradict the final three. Darcy's law does not seem to hold at high hydraulic gradients, and both the coefficients of permeability and volume compressibility decrease during consolidation. This is due to the non-linearity of the relationship between void ratio and effective stress, although for small stress increments assumption 7 is reasonable. Finally, the relationship between void ratio and effective stress is not independent of time, again proven by experimental results. Over the past century several formulations have been proposed for the effective stress according to several work hypotheses (e.g. compressibility of grains, their brittle or plastic behavior, high confining stress etc.) and different approaches have been proposed to provide a theoretical proof of the Terzaghi's principle for several kinds of porous media. The main approaches were based on the Theory of Porous Media, the Homogenization Approach, and Poroelasticity. Recently, a simple yet rigorous general proof was provided, based on classical elasticity theory. By way of example, at high pressures (e.g. in the Earth crust, at depth of some km, where the lithostatic load can reach values of several hundreds of MPa), Terzaghi's formulation shows relevant deviation from experimental data and the formulation provided by Alec Skempton should be used, to achieve more accurate results. Substantially, the effective stress definition is conventional and related to the problem being treated. Among various effective stress formulations, Terzaghi's one seems particularly appropriate, for its simplicity and as it describes with excellent approximation a wide variety of real cases.

== See also ==
- Karl von Terzaghi
