= Fluid flow through porous media =

Manner in which fluids behave when flowing through a porous medium

Diagram of Darcy's experiment for estimation of hydraulic conductivity and porosity.

In fluid mechanics, fluid flow through porous media is the manner in which fluids behave when flowing through a porous medium, for example sponge or wood, or when filtering water using sand or another porous material. As commonly observed, some fluid flows through the media while some mass of the fluid is stored in the pores present in the media.

Classical flow mechanics in porous media assumes that the medium is homogenous, isotropic, and has an intergranular pore structure. It also assumes that the fluid is a Newtonian fluid, that the reservoir is isothermal, that the well is vertical, etc. Traditional flow issues in porous media often involve single-phase steady state flow, multi-well interference, oil-water two-phase flow, natural gas flow, elastic energy driven flow, oil-gas two-phase flow, and gas-water two-phase flow.

The physicochemical flow process will involve various physical property changes and chemical reactions in contrast to the basic Newtonian fluid in the classical flow theory of porous system. Viscosity, surface tension, phase state, concentration, temperature, and other physical characteristics are examples of these properties. Non-Newtonian fluid flow, mass transfer through diffusion, and multiphase and multicomponent fluid flow are the primary flow issues.

== Governing laws ==
The movement of a fluid through porous media is described by the combination of Darcy's law with the principle of conservation of mass in order to express the capillary force or fluid velocity as a function of various other parameters including the effective pore radius, liquid viscosity or permeability. However, the use of Darcy's law alone does not produce accurate results for heterogeneous media like shale, and tight sandstones, where there is a huge proportion of nanopores. This necessitates the use of a flow model that considers the weighted proportion of various flow regimes like Darcy flow, transition flow, slip flow, and free molecular flow.

=== Darcy's law ===
Symbol	Description
$Q$	Volumetric flow rate [m^{3}/s]
$k$	Permeability of porous medium [m^{2}]. The permeability is a function of material type, and also varies with stress, temperature, etc.
$\mu$	Fluid viscosity [Pa.s]
$A$	Cross-sectional area of Porous medium [m^{2}]
$(p_b-p_a)$	Pressure drop across medium [Pa]
$L$	Length of sample [m]

The basic law governing the flow of fluids through porous media is Darcy's law, which was formulated by the French civil engineer Henry Darcy in 1856 on the basis of his experiments on vertical water filtration through sand beds.

According to Darcy's law, the fluid's viscosity, effective fluid permeability, and fluid pressure gradient determine the flow rate at any given location in the reservoir.

$$Q=\frac{-k A}{\mu} \frac{(p_b - p_a)}{L}$$

For transient processes in which the flux varies from point to-point, the following differential form of Darcy's law is used.

$$Q= \frac {-k A}{\mu} \left( \frac{d p}{d x} \right)$$

Darcy's law is valid for situation where the porous material is already saturated with the fluid. For the calculation of capillary imbibition speed of a liquid to an initially dry medium, Washburn's or Bosanquet's equations are used.

=== Mass conservation ===
Mass conservation of fluid across the porous medium involves the basic principle that mass flux in minus mass flux out equals the increase in amount stored by a medium. This means that total mass of the fluid is always conserved. In mathematical form, considering a time period from $t$ to $\Delta t$, length of porous medium from $x$ to $\Delta x$ and $m$ being the mass stored by the medium, we have

$$[A\rho (x)q(x) - A\rho (x + \Delta x)q(x + \Delta x )]\Delta t  = m(t + \Delta t) - m(t) .$$

Furthermore, we have that $m = \rho V_p$, where $V_p$ is the pore volume of the medium between $x$ and $x+\Delta x$ and $\rho$ is the density. So $m = \rho V_p = \rho \phi V = \rho \phi A\Delta x,$ where $\phi$ is the porosity. Dividing both sides by $A\Delta x$, while $\Delta x \rightarrow 0$, we have for 1 dimensional linear flow in a porous medium the relation

$$\frac{-d(\rho q)}{d x} = \frac{d(\rho \phi)}{d t} ~~~~ (i)$$

In three dimensions, the equation can be written as

$$\frac{d(\rho q)}{d x} + \frac{d(\rho q)}{d y} + \frac{d(\rho q)}{d z} = \frac{-d(\rho \phi)}{d t}$$

The mathematical operation on the left-hand side of this equation is known as the divergence of $\rho q$, and represents the rate at which fluid diverges from a given region, per unit volume.

== Diffusion equation ==
Material type	Compressibility (m^{2}N^{−1} or Pa^{−1})
Clay	10^{−6} - 10^{−8}
Sand	10^{−7} - 10^{−9}
Gravel	10^{−8} - 10^{−10}
Jointed rock	10^{−8} - 10^{−10}
Sound Rock	10^{−9} - 10^{−11}
Water (beta)	4.4 × 10^{−10}

Using product rule(and chain rule) on right hand side of the above mass conservation equation (i),

$$\frac{d(\rho \phi)}{d t} = \rho \frac{d \phi}{d t} + \phi \frac{d \rho}{d t} = \rho \frac{d \phi}{d P} \frac{d P}{d t} + \phi \frac{d \rho}{d P} \frac{d P}{d t} = \rho \phi \left [\frac{1}{\phi} \frac{d \phi}{d P} + \frac{1}{\rho} \frac{d \rho}{d P} \right] \quad \frac{d P}{d t} = \rho \phi [c_\phi + c_f]\frac{d P}{d t} ~~~~ (ii)$$

Here, $c_f$ = compressibility of the fluid and $c_\phi$ = compressibility of porous medium. Now considering the left hand side of the mass conservation equation, which is given by Darcy's law as

$$\frac{-d(\rho q)}{d x} = \frac{-d}{dx} \left [\frac{- \rho k}{\mu} \frac{d P}{d x} \right] \quad = \frac{k}{\mu} \left [\rho \frac{d^2 P}{d x^2} + \frac{d \rho}{d P} \frac{d P}{d x} \frac{d P}{d x} \right] \quad = \frac{\rho k}{\mu} \left[\frac{d^2 P}{d x^2} + \left (\frac{1}{\rho} \frac{d \rho}{d P}\right)\left(\frac{d P}{d x} \right)^2 \right ] \quad = \frac{\rho k}{\mu} \left [\frac{d^2 P}{d x^2} + c_f \left(\frac{d P}{d x}\right)^2 \right] \quad ~~~~ (iii)$$

Equating the results obtained in $(ii)$ & $(iii)$, we get

$$\frac{d^2 P}{d x^2} + c_f\left(\frac{d P}{d x}\right)^2 = \frac{\phi \mu (c_f + c_\phi)}{k} \frac{d P}{d t}$$

The second term on the left side is usually negligible, and we obtain the diffusion equation in 1 dimension as

$$\frac{d P}{d t} = \frac{k}{\phi \mu c_t} \frac{d^2 P}{d x^2}$$

where $c_t = c_f + c_\phi$.
