= Kožený =

Kožený (feminine: Kožená) is a Czech surname. Notable people with the surname include:

- Josef Kozeny (1889–1967), Austrian physicist
- Magdalena Kožená (born 1973), Czech opera singer
- Viktor Kožený (born 1963), Czech-born fugitive financier

== See also ==
- Kozeny–Carman equation, named after Josef
