= Darcy number =

Dimensionless number in fluid dynamics

In fluid dynamics through porous media, the Darcy number (Da) represents the relative effect of the permeability of the medium versus its cross-sectional area—commonly the diameter squared. The number is named after Henry Darcy and is found from nondimensionalizing the differential form of Darcy's law. This number should not be confused with the Darcy friction factor which applies to pressure drop in a pipe. It is defined as

$$\mathrm{Da} = \frac{K}{d^2}$$

where

- K is the permeability of the medium (SI units: m^{2});
- d is the characteristic length, e.g. the diameter of the particle (SI units: m).

Alternative forms of this number do exist depending on the approach by which Darcy's Law is made dimensionless and the geometry of the system. The Darcy number is commonly used in heat transfer through porous media.

== See also ==
- Capillary pressure
- Dimensionless quantity
