= Morris Muskat =

American petroleum engineer

- Morris Muskat
- Born: 21 April 1906; Riga, Russian Empire
- Died: 20 June 1998 (aged 92); Pasadena, California
- Known for: Darcy's law for multiphase flow
- Scientific career
- Institutions: Gulf Research & Development Company, Gulf Oil Corporation

Morris Muskat (21 April 1906 – 20 June 1998) was an American petroleum engineer. Muskat refined Darcy's equation for single phase flow, and this change made it suitable for the petroleum industry. Based on experimental results worked out by his colleagues, Muskat and Milan W. Meres also generalized Darcy's law to cover multiphase flow of water, oil and gas in the porous medium of a petroleum reservoir. The generalized flow equation provides the analytical foundation for reservoir engineering that exists to this day.

== Early life and career ==
Muskat was born in Riga, Russian Empire. He came to the United States with his family in 1911, and became an American citizen in 1914. Muskat attended Marietta College and Ohio State University, then taught physics at Bowling Green University. He earned his doctorate in physics from the California Institute of Technology in 1929.

After graduating from Caltech, Muskat joined Gulf Research & Development Company where he started as a Research Engineer and worked his way up to get the position as Chief of the Physics Division, a position he held until 1951. He took a one-year break from Gulf, during World War II, to serve as chief of the Acoustics Division of the Naval Ordnance Laboratory.

In 1951 he became technical coordinator of the Production Department, Gulf Oil Corporation in Pittsburgh, Pennsylvania. Dr. Muskat served as the Vice Chairman of the Petroleum Branch of AIME (now the Society of Petroleum Engineers) in 1953. In 1961 he was promoted to Technical Adviser to the Executive Group of Gulf Oil, a position he held until his retirement in 1971.

Muskat received many honors, including the American Petroleum Institute's Certificate of Appreciation (1965) and Special Scroll (1971), the Society of Petroleum Engineers's Lester C. Uren Award (1969), the American Institute of Mining, Metallurgical, and Petroleum Engineers's Lucas Medal (1953) and honorary (life) membership (1972), membership in the National Academy of Engineering (1983), and Caltech’s Alumni Distinguished Service Award (1987). He also has fifteen U.S. patents in various fields of science and engineering.

In his later years Muskat withdrew from professional life and relocated to Pasadena, California, where he died on June 20, 1998, at the age of 92.

== Research and publications ==
Muskat refined the original version of Darcy's equation for single-phase fluid (or homogenous fluid in Muskat terminology) flow by introducing fluid viscosity in the equation, as pointed out earlier by Charles Sumner Slichter, and replacing the hydraulic head by pressure and gravity force. The proportionality constant of the porous medium (which were both unconsolidated sand and consolidated sandstone in the laboratory experiments), using the new refined equation, is called single-phase permeability or absolute permeability, and is now a pure rock property as the fluid viscosity is explicit in the new flow equation. The pressure and gravity force link the refined equation to basic properties in physics, which makes the connection to capillary pressure, and thus Leverett J-function, direct and makes the connection to fluid density visible in the new equation. By these refinements Muskat established a refined flow equation for single phase fluid flow that is valid for water, oil and gas, and thus is suitable for use in the petroleum industry. Muskat and his colleagues verified the new equation by experiments.

Another problem that faced Muskat and his colleagues, is that an oil reservoir has large horizontal dimensions, and production wells are spread all over it. Where will the oil flow? Today the reservoir engineer will use numerical reservoir simulation to answer that question. In the 1930s there were no computers, so Muskat turned to experimental analogues to fluid flow such as heat flow and electric current. Again Muskat refined Darcy's equation by generalizing to three equations for the three space dimensions, as pointed out earlier by Philipp Forchheimer. The single-phase permeability was generalized to be a 3x3 tensor which is usually represented by a diagonal tensor where the vertical permeability differ from the two horizontal permeabilities.

In 1937 Muskat published The Flow of Homogeneous Fluids Through Porous Media. In this book Muskat focused on flow of single-phase fluid in a porous medium, and what type of differential equation can be used to model this flow behavior. Large emphasize is put on discussing results of experimental analogues such as heat flow and electric current. This book also presents and refers to experimental findings made by his colleagues.

An oil reservoir usually has an aquifer below the oil leg, and sometimes also a gas cap above the oil leg. As oil is produced from the oil leg, water and gas will flow into this zone where some oil is still flowing. The operating company may also inject water or gas into the oil reservoir in order to increase oil recovery. The equations for reservoir dynamic must therefore include multi-phase flow of water, oil and gas. As water flow from below and gas flow from above the oil leg, the local mixture of fluid phases will usually only be two phases.

Muskat, with assistance of geophysicist Milan W. Meres (1906–1963), analyzed results from the steady-state and the transient flow experiments of Ralph Dewey Wyckoff and Holbrook Gorham Botset. The experimental results showed that the flow of a mixture experienced an effective permeability that was reduced compared to the single-phase permeability. The reduced permeability correlated non-linearly with volume fraction of the other phase, and the reduction factor (or function) is denoted relative permeability. The formulation is based on Muskat's theory that the porous medium has a local structure of macroscopic size that is defined by the saturations, or volume fractions, of the fluid mixture. Muskat included the new permeability-reducing parameter in the refined single-phase flow equations, and thus established a new differential equation that governs the flow of multi-phase fluids in porous media. The experimental findings of Wyckoff and Botset and the analytical / theoretical findings of Muskat and Meres were published as two coordinated papers in 1936.

In 1949 Muskat published Physical Principles of Oil Production, which advanced the field of reservoir dynamics and reservoir engineering, compared to his 1937 book, and provided the analytical foundation for reservoir engineering that exists to this day.

== See also ==
- Hydrogeology
- Hydraulic head

== Selected publications ==
=== Books ===
- Muskat, Morris (1937). The Flow of Homogeneous Fluids Through Porous Media. New York: McGraw-Hill. ISBN 978-0934634168.
- Muskat, Morris (1949). Physical Principles of Oil Production. New York: McGraw-Hill. ISBN 978-0934634076.

=== Articles ===
- Muskat M. and Botset, H.G. 1931; Flow of Gas Through Porous Materials; Paper published in J. Appl. Phys. vol. 1, no. 1, pp. 27–47, 1931.
- Wyckhoff R.D. and Botset H.G. and Muskat M. 1932; Flow of liquids through porous media under the action of gravity; Paper published in Physics vol 3, no 2, pp 90–113 (August 1932); OCLC number 36593762.
- Wyckoff R.D. and Botset H.G. and Muskat M. 1933; The Mechanics of Porous Flow Applied to Water-flooding Problems; Paper published in Transactions of the AIME 103 (1933), pp 219–249.
- Wyckoff R.D. and Botset H.G. and Muskat M. and Reed D.W. 1934; Measurement of Permeability of Porous Media; Bulletin of the American Association of Petroleum Geologists vol. 18, no. 2, 1934.
- Muskat M. 1934; The Flow of Compressible Fluids Through Porous Media and Some Problems in Heat Conduction; Paper published in J. Appl. Phys. vol. 5, no. 3, pp 71–94, 1934.
- Muskat M. and Wyckoff R.D. 1935; An Approximate Theory of Water-Coning in Oil Production; Paper published in Transactions of the AIME 114 (1935).
- Muskat M. and Meres M.W. 1936; The Flow of Heterogeneous Fluids Through Porous Media; Paper published in J. Appl. Phys. 7, pp 346–363 (1936); https://dx.doi.org/10.1063/1.1745403
- Muskat M. and Wyckoff R.D and Botset H.G. and Meres M.W. 1937; Flow of Gas-liquid Mixtures through Sands; Published in Transactions of the AIME 123 (1937), pp 69–96; Document ID SPE-937069-G; https://dx.doi.org/10.2118/937069-G
