= Governing equation =

Equations describing behavior of a model

The governing equations of a mathematical model describe how the values of the unknown variables (i.e. the dependent variables) change when one or more of the known (i.e. independent) variables change.

Physical systems can be modeled phenomenologically at various levels of sophistication, with each level capturing a different degree of detail about the system. A governing equation represents the most detailed and fundamental phenomenological model currently available for a given system.

For example, at the coarsest level, a beam is just a 1D curve whose torque is a function of local curvature. At a more refined level, the beam is a 2D body whose stress-tensor is a function of local strain-tensor, and strain-tensor is a function of its deformation. The equations are then a PDE system. Note that both levels of sophistication are phenomenological, but one is deeper than the other. As another example, in fluid dynamics, the Navier-Stokes equations are more refined than Euler equations.

As the field progresses and our understanding of the underlying mechanisms deepens, governing equations may be replaced or refined by new, more accurate models that better represent the system's behavior. These new governing equations can then be considered the deepest level of phenomenological model at that point in time.

== Mass balance ==
A mass balance, also called a material balance, is an application of conservation of mass to the analysis of physical systems. It is the simplest governing equation, and it is simply a budget (balance calculation) over the quantity in question:

$\text{Input} + \text{Generation} = \text{Output} + \text{Accumulation} \ + \text{Consumption}$

== Differential equation ==
=== Physics ===
The governing equations in classical physics that are lectured at universities are listed below.

- balance of mass
- balance of (linear) momentum
- balance of angular momentum
- balance of energy
- balance of entropy
- Maxwell-Faraday equation for induced electric field
- Ampére-Maxwell equation for induced magnetic field
- Gauss equation for electric flux
- Gauss equation for magnetic flux

=== Classical continuum mechanics ===
The basic equations in classical continuum mechanics are all balance equations, and as such each of them contains a time-derivative term which calculates how much the dependent variable change with time. For an isolated, frictionless / inviscid system the first four equations are the familiar conservation equations in classical mechanics.

Darcy's law of groundwater flow has the form of a volumetric flux caused by a pressure gradient. A flux in classical mechanics is normally not a governing equation, but usually a defining equation for transport properties. Darcy's law was originally established as an empirical equation, but is later shown to be derivable as an approximation of Navier-Stokes equation combined with an empirical composite friction force term. This explains the duality in Darcy's law as a governing equation and a defining equation for absolute permeability.

The non-linearity of the material derivative in balance equations in general, and the complexities of Cauchy's momentum equation and Navier-Stokes equation makes the basic equations in classical mechanics exposed to establishing of simpler approximations.

Some examples of governing differential equations in classical continuum mechanics are

- Hele-Shaw flow
- Plate theory
  - Kirchhoff–Love plate theory
  - Mindlin–Reissner plate theory
- Vortex shedding
- Annular fin
- Astronautics
- Finite volume method for unsteady flow
- Acoustic theory
- Precipitation hardening
- Kelvin's circulation theorem
- Kernel function for solving integral equation of surface radiation exchanges
- Nonlinear acoustics
- Large eddy simulation
- Föppl–von Kármán equations
- Timoshenko beam theory

=== Biology ===
A famous example of governing differential equations within biology is

- Lotka-Volterra equations are prey-predator equations

== Sequence of states ==
A governing equation may also be a state equation, an equation describing the state of the system, and thus actually be a constitutive equation that has "stepped up the ranks" because the model in question was not meant to include a time-dependent term in the equation. This is the case for a model of an oil production plant which on the average operates in a steady state mode. Results from one thermodynamic equilibrium calculation are input data to the next equilibrium calculation together with some new state parameters, and so on. In this case the algorithm and sequence of input data form a chain of actions, or calculations, that describes change of states from the first state (based solely on input data) to the last state that finally comes out of the calculation sequence.

== See also ==
- Constitutive equation
- Mass balance
- Master equation
- Mathematical model
- Primitive equations
