= Maurice Anthony Biot =

Belgian-American physicist (1905–1985)

- Born: May 25, 1905; Antwerp, Belgium
- Died: September 12, 1985 (aged 80); Brussels, Belgium
- Education: Catholic University of Leuven (D.Sc, 1931); California Institute of Technology (Ph.D, 1932)
- Known for: Biot stress Biot–Tolstoy–Medwin diffraction model Poroelasticity; Poromechanics
- Awards: Timoshenko Medal (1962); Theodore von Karman Medal (1967)
- Scientific career
- Fields: Applied Physics, Aeronautical Engineering, Earthquake Engineering
- Workplaces: Harvard University; Catholic University of Leuven; Columbia University; Brown University
- Doctoral advisor: Theodore von Kármán

Maurice Anthony Biot (May 25, 1905 – September 12, 1985) was a Belgian-American applied physicist. He made contributions in thermodynamics, aeronautics, geophysics, earthquake engineering, and electromagnetism. Particularly, he was accredited as the founder of the theory of poroelasticity.

Born in Antwerp, Belgium, Biot studied at Catholic University of Leuven in Belgium where he received a bachelor's degrees in philosophy (1927), mining engineering (1929) and electrical engineering (1930), and Doctor of Science in 1931. He obtained his Ph.D. in Aeronautical Science from the California Institute of Technology in 1932 under Theodore von Kármán.

In 1930s and 1940s Biot worked at Harvard University, the Catholic University of Leuven, Columbia University and Brown University, and later for a number of companies and government agencies, including NASA during the Space Program in the 1960s. After 1969 Biot became a private consultant for various companies and agencies, and particularly for Shell Research and Development.

Biot's early work with von Kármán and during the World War II working for the US Navy Bureau of Aeronautics led to the development of the three-dimensional theory of aircraft flutter. During the period between 1932 and 1942, he conceived and then fully developed the response spectrum method (RSM) for earthquake engineering. For irreversible thermodynamics, Biot utilized the variational approach and was the first to introduce the dissipation function and the minimum dissipation principle to account for the dissipation phenomenon, which led to the development of thermoelasticity, heat transfer, viscoelasticity, and thermorheology. Biot's interest in the non-linear effects of initial stress and the inelastic behavior of solids led to his mathematical theory of folding of stratified rocks. In the period between 1935 and 1962 Biot published a number of scientific papers that lay the foundations of the theory of poroelasticity (now known as Biot theory), which describes the mechanical behaviour of fluid-saturated porous media.

Biot is a recipient of the Timoshenko Medal (1962) and the von Kármán Medal (1967). He was an Honorary Fellow of the Acoustical Society of America, a member of the US National Academy of Engineering [37, 46], and was elected a Fellow of the American Academy of Arts and Sciences. He died in his Brussels apartment aged 80.

To honor Biot's pioneering contributions, a Maurice A. Biot Medal was established by the Engineering Mechanics Institute of American Society of Civil Engineers. A Biot Conference on Poromechanics was established and was held at Université catholique de Louvain, Belgium (1998), Universite Joseph Fourier, France (2002), University of Oklahoma, USA (2005), Columbia University, USA (2009), and Technical University of Vienna, Austria (2013).
