= Darcy (unit) =

Unit of permeability

darcy
- Unit of: Permeability
- Symbol: d
- Named after: Henry Darcy
- Derivation: cP⋅cm^{2}/(s⋅atm)

Conversions
1 d in ...	... is equal to ...
- SI: 9.869233×10^{−13} m^{2}

The darcy (or darcy unit) and millidarcy (md, or incorrectly mD) are units of permeability, named after Henry Darcy. They are not SI units, but they are widely used in petroleum engineering and geology. The unit has also been used in biophysics and biomechanics, where the flow of fluids such as blood through capillary beds and cerebrospinal fluid through the brain interstitial space is being examined. A darcy has dimensions of length^{2}.

== Definition ==
Permeability measures the ability of fluids to flow through rock (or other porous media). The darcy is defined using Darcy's law, which can be written as:

$$Q = \frac{A k\,\Delta P}{\mu\,\Delta x}$$

where:

$Q\,$	is the volumetric fluid flow rate through the medium
$A\,$	is the area of the medium
$k\,$	is the permeability of the medium
$\mu\,$	is the dynamic viscosity of the fluid
$\Delta P\,$	is the applied pressure difference
$\Delta x\,$	is the thickness of the medium

The darcy is referenced to a mixture of unit systems. A medium with a permeability of 1 darcy permits a flow of 1 cm^{3}/s of a fluid with viscosity 1 cP (1 mPa·s) under a pressure gradient of 1 atm/cm acting across an area of 1 cm^{2}.

Typical values of permeability range as high as 100,000 darcys for gravel, to less than 0.01 microdarcys for granite. Sand has a permeability of approximately 1 darcy.

Tissue permeability, whose measurement in vivo is still in its infancy, is somewhere in the range of 0.01 to 100 darcy.

== Origin ==
The darcy is named after Henry Darcy. Rock permeability is usually expressed in millidarcys (md) because rocks hosting hydrocarbon or water accumulations typically exhibit permeability ranging from 5 to 500 md.

The odd combination of units comes from Darcy's original studies of water flow through columns of sand. Water has a viscosity of 1.0019 cP at about room temperature.

The unit abbreviation "d" is not capitalized, though many in the industry regularly miscapitalize it. The American Association of Petroleum Geologists uses the following unit abbreviations and grammar in their publications:

- darcy (plural darcys, not darcies): d
- millidarcy (plural millidarcys): md

== Conversions ==
Converted to SI units, 1 darcy is equivalent to 9.869233×10^{−13} m^{2} or 0.9869233 μm^{2}. This conversion is usually approximated as 1 μm^{2}. This is the reciprocal of 1.013250—the conversion factor from atmospheres to bars.

Specifically in the hydrology domain, permeability of soil or rock may also be defined as the flux of water under hydrostatic pressure (≈ 0.1 bar/m) at a temperature of 20 °C. In this specific setup, 1 darcy is equivalent to 0.831 m/day.
