= Henri Brinkman =

Dutch mathematician and physicist

Henri Coenraad Brinkman (Amsterdam, 30 March 1908 – Delft, 11 February 1961) was a Dutch mathematician and physicist. He was a professor at the University of Groningen.

The dimensionless Brinkman number is named after him.

== See also ==
- Brinkman form of Darcy's law
