= Bosanquet equation =

Equation in fluid dynamics

In the theory of capillarity, Bosanquet equation is an improved modification of the simpler Lucas–Washburn theory for the motion of a liquid in a thin capillary tube or a porous material that can be approximated as a large collection of capillaries. In the Lucas–Washburn model, the inertia of the fluid is ignored, leading to the assumption that flow is continuous under constant viscous laminar Poiseuille flow conditions without considering the effects of mass transport undergoing acceleration occurring at the start of flow and at points of changing internal capillary geometry. The Bosanquet equation is a differential equation that is second-order in the time derivative, similar to Newton's second law, and therefore takes into account the fluid inertia. Equations of motion, like the Washburn's equation, that attempt to explain a velocity (instead of acceleration) as proportional to a driving force are often described with the term Aristotelian mechanics.

== Definition ==
When using the notation $\eta$ for dynamic viscosity, $\theta$ for the liquid-solid contact angle, $\gamma$ for surface tension, $\rho$ for the fluid density, t for time, and r for the cross-sectional radius of the capillary and x for the distance the fluid has advanced, the Bosanquet equation of motion is

$$\frac{d}{dt}\left( \pi r^2 \rho x \frac{dx}{dt}\right) + 8\pi \eta x \frac{dx}{dt} = 2\pi r \gamma \cos \theta,$$

Assuming that the motion is completely driven by surface tension, with no applied pressure at either end of the capillary tube.

== Solution ==
The solution of the Bosanquet equation can be split into two timescales, firstly to account for the initial motion of the fluid by considering a solution in the limit of time approaching 0 giving the form

$$x^2(t) - x^2(0) = \frac{2b}{a}\left[ t - \frac{1}{a}(1-e^{-at})\right]$$

where

$$a = \frac{8\eta}{\rho r^2}$$

and

$$b = \frac{2\gamma \cos \theta}{\rho r}.$$

For the condition of short time this shows a meniscus front position proportional to time rather than the Lucas-Washburn square root of time, and the independence of viscosity demonstrates plug flow.

As time increases after the initial time of acceleration, the equation decays to the familiar Lucas-Washburn form dependent on viscosity and the square root of time.

== See also ==
- Washburn's equation
- Hagen–Poiseuille equation
- Newton's Second Law
