= Philipp Forchheimer =

Austrian engineer

- Born: 7 August 1852; Vienna, Austrian Empire
- Died: 2 October 1933 (aged 81); Dürnstein, Lower Austria, Austria
- Education: University of Tubingen (D)
- Known for: Hydraulics

Philipp Forchheimer (7 August 1852 – 2 October 1933) was an Austrian engineer, a pioneer in the field of civil engineering and practical hydraulics, who also contributed to the archaeological study of Byzantine water supply systems. He was professor in Istanbul, Aachen, and Graz.

Forchheimer introduced mathematical methodology to the study of hydraulics, thus establishing a scientific basis for the field. He graduated as engineer from the Technische Hochschule Zürich in 1873, received his doctoral degree from the University of Tübingen, and completed habilitation at the Technische Hochschule Aachen. He was the rector of the Graz University of Technology until 1897. In addition to his teaching, he worked as a consultant for underground construction projects. He made proposals for the construction of a tunnel under the English Channel.

In 1891, he took up a parallel appointment in Constantinople at the Ottoman School of Engineering, which he successfully re-organised in 1914. His work in Turkey led to a study of the Byzantine cisterns with the archaeologist Josef Strzygowski. In 1897 or 1898, he spent a month researching aqueduct systems at the Austrian excavations in Ephesus.

== Modification to Darcy's law ==
Forchheimer proposed a modification to Darcy's law, describing fluid flow through packed beds in 1901. This also had a significant influence on the development of the Ergun equation.

$-{dP \over dx}={\mu \over K}u+b\rho|u|u$

where:

$dP$ is the pressure drop across the bed,
$\mu$ is the viscosity of the fluid,
$K$ permeability (const.),
$u$ is the (area-averaged) velocity of the fluid,
$b$ is an empirical constant,
$\rho$ is the density of the fluid.

A more general expression of the friction factor follows from Forchheimers modification:

$f={1 \over \mathrm{Re}}+C$

where $\mathrm{Re}$ is the Reynolds number and C is a constant.

== Works ==
- Englische Tunnelbauten bei Untergrundbahnen, sowie unter Flüssen und Meeresarmen, Aachen 1884
- Die Eisenbahn von Ismid nach Angora, Berlin 1891 (offprint from Zeitschrift für Bauwesen 41 (1891): 359–379)
- Die byzantinischen Wasserbehälter von Konstantinopel. Beiträge zur Geschichte der byzantinischen Baukunst und zur Topographie von Konstantinopel (with Josef Strzygowski), Wien 1893
- Lehr- und Handbuch der Hydraulik, 5 volumes, 1914–16
- "Wasserleitungen", in Forschungen in Ephesos, vol. 3, Wien 1923, pp. 224–255

== See also ==
- Darcy's Law
- Ergun Equation
- Reynolds Number
