= Sabri Ergun =

Turkish chemical engineer

- Born: March 1, 1918; Gerede, Ottoman Empire
- Died: February 18, 2006 (aged 87); Madison, Wisconsin, United States
- Education: Columbia University; Vienna University of Technology
- Known for: Ergun equation
- Scientific career
- Fields: Chemical engineering
- Workplaces: Carnegie Institute of Technology; Lawrence Berkeley National Laboratory

Sabri Ergun (1 March 1918 – 18 February 2006) was a Turkish chemical engineer. He is known for the Ergun equation, which expresses the pressure drop across a packed bed.

== Biography ==
Sabri Ergun was born on 1 March 1918 in Gerede in the Ottoman Empire (now Turkey). He moved to the United States in 1943. He received B.S. and M.S. degrees in chemical engineering from Columbia University and a D.Sc. degree from the Vienna University of Technology in 1956. He was married to Dorothy Karns in 1948, and they had three children: David, Robert and James. Ergun served as a staff member of the Coal Research Laboratory at the Carnegie Institute of Technology and was employed by the U.S. Bureau of Mines as project coordinator of Solid State physics. In 1969, he accepted an invitation to serve as a visiting professor at the University of Karlsruhe in Germany. For four years, Ergun worked at Bechtel Corporation as consultant in the field of Waste-to-Oil process development. In 1977, Ergun joined the Lawrence Berkeley Laboratory of the University of California where he was responsible for research programs on the production of synthetic fuels from coals and biomass until he retired in 1980. He died in 2006 in Madison, Wisconsin, where he had lived since 1999.
