= Poroelasticity =

Field in materials science and mechanics

Poroelasticity is a field in materials science and mechanics that studies the interaction between fluid flow, pressure and bulk solid deformation within a linear porous medium and it is an extension of elasticity and porous medium flow (diffusion equation). The deformation of the medium influences the flow of the fluid and vice versa. The theory was proposed by Maurice Anthony Biot (1935, 1941) as a theoretical extension of soil consolidation models developed to calculate the settlement of structures placed on fluid-saturated porous soils. The theory of poroelasticity has been widely applied in geomechanics, hydrology, biomechanics, tissue mechanics, cell mechanics, and micromechanics.

An intuitive sense of the response of a saturated elastic porous medium to mechanical loading can be developed by thinking about, or experimenting with, a fluid-saturated sponge. If a fluid- saturated sponge is compressed, fluid will flow from the sponge. If the sponge is in a fluid reservoir and compressive pressure is subsequently removed, the sponge will reimbibe the fluid and expand. The volume of the sponge will also increase if its exterior openings are sealed and the pore fluid pressure is increased. The basic ideas underlying the theory of poroelastic materials are that the pore fluid pressure contributes to the total stress in the porous matrix medium and that the pore fluid pressure alone can strain the porous matrix medium. There is fluid movement in a porous medium due to differences in pore fluid pressure created by different pore volume strains associated with mechanical loading of the porous medium. In unconventional reservoir and source rocks for natural gas like coal and shales, there can be strain due to sorption of gases like methane and carbon dioxide on the porous rock surfaces. Depending on the gas pressure the induced sorption-based strain can be poroelastic or poroinelastic in nature.

== Types of Poroelasticity ==
The theories of poroelasticity can be divided into two categories: static (or quasi-static) and dynamic theories, just like mechanics can be divided into statics and dynamics. The static poroelasticity considers processes in which the fluid movement and solid skeleton deformation occur simultaneously and affect each other. The static poroelasticity is predominant in the literature for poroelasticity; as a result, this term is used interchangeably with poroelasticity in many publications. This static poroelasticity theory is a generalization of the one-dimensional consolidation theory in soil mechanics. This theory was developed from Biot's work in 1941. The dynamic poroelasticity is proposed for understanding the wave propagation in both the liquid and solid phases of saturated porous materials. The inertial and associated kinetic energy, which are not considered in static poroelasticity, are included. This is especially necessary when the speed of the movement of the phases in the porous material is considerable, e.g., when vibration or stress waves is present. The dynamic poroelasticity was developed attributed to Biot's work on the propagation of elastic waves in fluid-saturated media.

== Laboratory Measurements ==
Three type of tests are commonly used to determine the poroelastic parameters:

=== Drained test ===
In a drained test, the confining pressure is increased while the pore pressure at the boundary of the material is kept at its initial value. Consequently, an incremental pore pressure is initially generated within the rock, corresponding to an undrained condition. This excess pore pressure gradually dissipates as the system equilibrates with the imposed boundary pore pressure. From this test, two measurements can be obtained: the volume change of the material and the volume of fluid removed from the material.

=== Undrained test ===
In an undrained test, similar to a drained test, the confining pressure applied to the material is increased. However, the key difference is that no fluid is allowed to leave the sample during the test. Under this condition, the increase in confining pressure induces a change in pore pressure within the material. This test allows the measurement of the volumetric change of the sample and the corresponding change in pore pressure.

=== Unjacketed test ===
Unlike the previous two tests, no controlled confining pressure is applied directly to the sample. Instead, the sample is placed in a pressure vessel, where equal increments of confining pressure and pore pressure are applied simultaneously. Since the pore pressure varies during the test, calibration is required to determine the change in fluid volume within the sample. This test enables the measurement of the unjacketed compressibility and a storage coefficient defined under equal-pressure loading conditions.

== Literature ==
References for the theory of poroelasticity:

- Detournay E, Cheng AH (1993). "Fundamentals of poroelasticity" (PDF). In Fairhurst C (ed.). Comprehensive Rock Engineering: Principles, Practice and Projects. Vol. II, Analysis and Design Method. Pergamon Press. pp. 113–171.
- Cheng AH (2016). Poroelasticity. Theory and Applications of Transport in Porous Media. Vol. 27. Springer. doi:10.1007/978-3-319-25202-5. ISBN 978-3-319-25200-1. S2CID 240649873.
- Wang HF (2000). Theory of linear poroelasticity with applications to geomechanics and hydrogeology. Princeton University Press.
- Zhen (Leo) Liu (2018). Multiphysics in Porous Materials. Springer. ISBN 9783319930275.
- Reint de Boer (2000). Theory of Porous Media - Highlights in Historical Development and Current State. Springer. ISBN 9783642640629.
- Coussy, Olivier (2003-12-09). Poromechanics. doi:10.1002/0470092718. ISBN 9780470092712.

== See also ==
- Advanced Simulation Library
