= Henri-Émile Bazin =

French hydraulic engineer

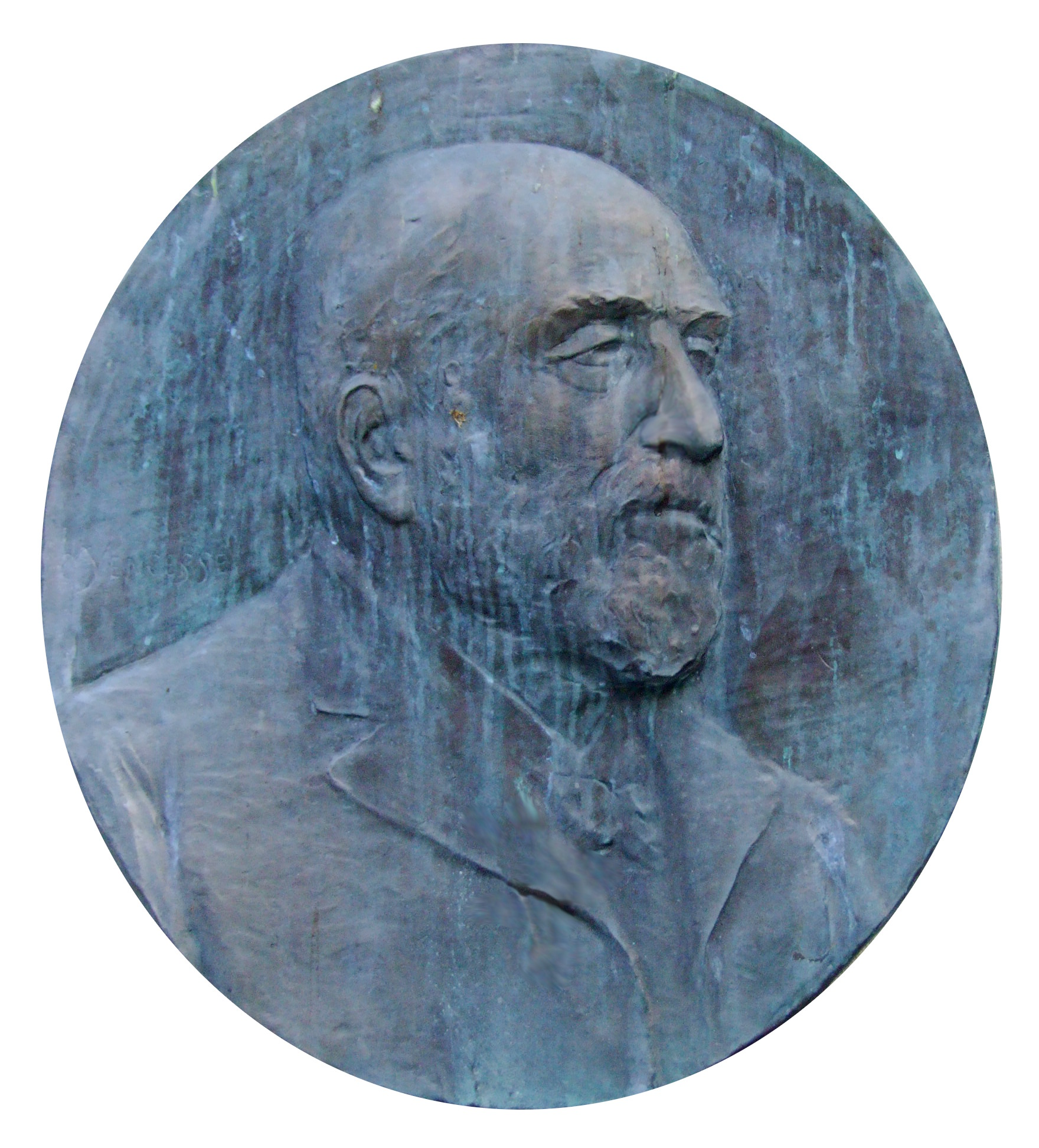
- Born: 10 January 1829; Nancy, France
- Died: 7 February 1917 (aged 88); Dijon, France
- Scientific career
- Fields: Engineering

Henri-Émile Bazin (10 January 1829 – 7 February 1917), also known as Henry Bazin, was a French engineer specializing in hydraulic engineering, and whose main contributions relate to the systematic study of free surface flows and the measurement of flows (gauging). He worked on the Canal de Bourgogne, and was influential in the development of suction dredgers.

== Selected publications ==
- Henry Darcy, Henri Bazin, "Recherches hydrauliques entreprises par M. Henry Darcy continuées par M. Henri Bazin. Première partie. Recherches expérimentales sur l'écoulement de l'eau dans les canaux découverts," Paris, Imprimerie impériale, 1865.
- Henry Darcy, Henri Bazin, "Recherches hydrauliques entreprises par M. Henry Darcy continuées par M. Henri Bazin. Deuxième partie. Recherches expérimentales relatives au remous et à la propagation des ondes," Paris, Imprimerie impériale, 1865.
