= Edward Wight Washburn =

American chemist

- Born: May 10, 1881; Beatrice, Nebraska, U.S.
- Died: February 6, 1934 (aged 52)
- Education: University of Nebraska, Massachusetts Institute of Technology
- Known for: Washburn's equation, heavy water discovering
- Scientific career
- Fields: Chemistry, Physics
- Workplaces: University of Illinois
- Academic advisors: Arthur Amos Noyes

Edward Wight Washburn (May 10, 1881 – February 6, 1934) was an American chemist.

Washburn was born in Beatrice, Nebraska, in the family of William Gilmor Washburn, a lumber and brick merchant. Having taken all the chemistry courses available at the University of Nebraska (1899–1900) while teaching high school students (1899–1901), he entered the Massachusetts Institute of Technology in 1901, receiving a B.S. in chemistry in 1905 and a Ph.D. in 1908 under Arthur Amos Noyes.

Later that year Washburn became head of the division of physical chemistry at the University of Illinois. In 1916 he became chairman of the university's department of ceramic engineering.

In 1920 the International Union of Pure and Applied Chemistry was founded. One of its first projects was to compile the International Critical Tables of Numerical Data, Physics, Chemistry and Technology. Washburn was named editor-in-chief in 1922 and moved to Washington. In 1926 he became head of the division of chemistry of the National Bureau of Standards. Washburn was chairman of the division of chemistry and chemical technology of the National Research Council in 1922–1923, chairman of the International Commission on Physico-Chemical Standards, and a member of the National Academy of Sciences.

== See also ==
- Washburn's equation
