= Kernel function for solving integral equation of surface radiation exchanges =

Heat transfer calculation

In physics and engineering, the radiative heat transfer from one surface to another is the equal to the difference of incoming and outgoing radiation from the first surface. In general, the heat transfer between surfaces is governed by temperature, surface emissivity properties and the geometry of the surfaces. The relation for heat transfer can be written as an integral equation with boundary conditions based upon surface conditions. Kernel functions can be useful in approximating and solving this integral equation.

== Governing equation ==
The radiative heat exchange depends on the local surface temperature of the enclosure and the properties of the surfaces, but does not depend upon the media. Because media neither absorb, emit, nor scatter radiation.

Governing equation of heat transfer between two surface A_{i} and A_{j}
$$\begin{align}
q(r_i) ={}& \int_{\lambda=0}^\infty \int_{\psi_i=0}^{2\pi} \int_{\theta_i=0}^\frac{\pi}{2} \varepsilon_{\lambda,i} (\lambda,\psi_i,\theta_i,r_i) I_{b\lambda,i}(\cos\theta_i\sin\theta_i)\,d\theta_i\,d\psi_i\,d\lambda \\
&- \sum_{j=1}^N \int_{\lambda=0}^\infty \rho_{\lambda,i}(\lambda,\psi_{r,j},\theta_{r,j},\psi_j,\theta_j,r_i) I_{\lambda,k}(\lambda,\psi_k,\theta_k,r_i) \frac{\cos\theta_j\cos\theta_k}{|r_k-r_j|^2} \, dA_k
\end{align}$$
where

- $\lambda$ is the wavelength of radiation rays,
- $I$ is the radiation intensity,
- $\varepsilon$ is the emissivity,
- $r$ is the reflectivity,
- $\theta$ is the angle between the normal of the surface and radiation exchange direction, and
- $\psi$ is the azimuthal angle

If the surface of the enclosure is approximated as gray and diffuse surface, and so the above equation can be written as after the analytical procedure
$$q(r) + \varepsilon(r) E_b = \varepsilon(r) \oint K(r,r') \left[ E_b(r') + 1 - \frac{\varepsilon(r')}{\varepsilon(r)} d\Gamma(r')\right]$$
where $E_b$ is the black body emissive power which is given as the function of temperature of the black body
$$E_b(r) = \sigma T^4(r)$$
where $\sigma$ is the Stefan–Boltzmann constant.

== Kernel function ==
Kernel functions provide a way to manipulate data as though it were projected into a higher dimensional space, by operating on it in its original space. So that data in higher-dimensional space become more easily separable. Kernel function is also used in integral equation for surface radiation exchanges. Kernel function relates to both the geometry of the enclosure and its surface properties. Kernel function depends on geometry of the body.

In above equation K(r,r′) is the kernel function for the integral, which for 3-D problems takes the following form
$$K(r,r') = -\frac{n(r-r')n'(r-r')}{\pi|r-r'|^4} F = \frac{\cos\theta_r\cos\theta_r'}{\pi|r-r'|^4} F$$
where F assumes a value of one when the surface element I sees the surface element J, otherwise it is zero if the ray is blocked and θr is the angle at point r, and θr′ at point r′. The parameter F depends on the geometric configuration of the body, so the kernel function highly irregular for a geometrically complex enclosure.

== Kernel equation for 2-D and axisymmetric geometry ==
For 2-D and axisymmetric configurations, the kernel function can be analytically integrated along the z or θ direction. The integration of the kernel function is
$$K(r,r') = - \iint F\frac{n(r-r') n'(r-r')}{\pi|r-r'|^4}\, dz'\, dz = \frac{n(r-r') n'(r-r')}{\pi|r-r'|^4} F$$

Here n denotes the unit normal of element I at the azimuth angle ϕ′ being zero, and n′ refers to the unit normal of element J with any azimuth angle ϕ′. The mathematical expressions for n and n′ are as follows:
$$\begin{align}
n &= ( \cos\theta,0,\sin\theta) \\
n' &= (\cos\theta'\sin\phi', \cos\theta'\sin\phi', \sin\theta')
\end{align}$$

Substituting these terms into equation, the kernel function is rearranged in terms of the azimuth angle ϕ'-
$$K(\phi') = \frac{(c'+d\cos\phi') (c''+d\cos\phi')}{\pi(c+d\cos\phi')^2} F$$
where
$$\begin{align}
c &= r_i^2+r_j^2+Z_j^2 \\
d &= -2r_ir_j \\
c' &= Z_j\sin\theta - r_i\cos\theta \\
d' &= r_j\cos\theta \\
c'' &=Z_j\sin\theta'+r_j\cos\theta' \\
d'' &=-r_i\cos\theta'
\end{align}$$

Relation
$$\frac{d\left\{\arctan\left(\sqrt\frac{c-d}{c+d} \tan\frac{\phi}{2}\right)\right\}}{dx} = \frac{\sqrt{c^2-d^2}}{2(c+d\cos\phi)}$$
holds for this particular case.

The final expression for the kernel function is
$$\bar k(\phi) = 2\int_0^\phi k(\phi') \, d\phi' = -\frac{2}{\pi} \left[A\phi+b\arctan\left(\sqrt\frac{c-d}{c+d} \tan\frac{\phi}{2}\right)+C\frac{\sin\phi}{c+d\cos\phi}\right]$$
where

$$\begin{align}
A &= \frac{d'd''}{d^2} \\
B &= 2\frac{(c^2-d^2)(d'f+ed'')+cdef}{d(c^2-d^2)\sqrt{c^2-d^2}} \\
C &= \frac{def}{d^2-c^2} \\
e &= \frac{dc'-cd'}{d} \\
f &= \frac{dc''-cd''}{d}
\end{align}$$
