= Washburn's equation =

Equation describing the penetration length of a liquid into a capillary tube with time

In physics, Washburn's equation describes capillary flow in a bundle of parallel cylindrical tubes; it is extended with some issues also to imbibition into porous materials. The equation is named after Edward Wight Washburn; also known as Lucas–Washburn equation, considering that Richard Lucas wrote a similar paper three years earlier, or the Bell-Cameron-Lucas-Washburn equation, considering J.M. Bell and F.K. Cameron's discovery of the form of the equation in 1906.

== Derivation ==
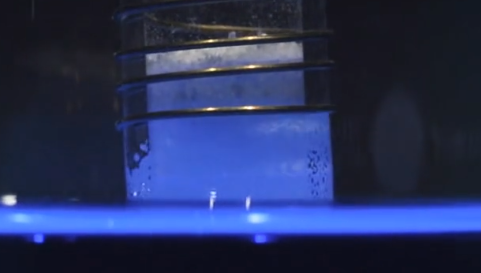
Powder wettability measurement with the Washburn method.

In its most general form the Lucas Washburn equation describes the penetration length ($L$) of a liquid into a capillary pore or tube with time $t$ as $L=(Dt)^{\frac{1}{2}}$, where $D$ is a simplified diffusion coefficient. This relationship, which holds true for a variety of situations, captures the essence of Lucas and Washburn's equation and shows that capillary penetration and fluid transport through porous structures exhibit diffusive behaviour akin to that which occurs in numerous physical and chemical systems. The diffusion coefficient $D$ is governed by the geometry of the capillary as well as the properties of the penetrating fluid. A liquid having a dynamic viscosity $\eta$ and surface tension $\gamma$ will penetrate a distance $L$ into the capillary whose pore radius is $r$ following the relationship:

$L=\sqrt{\frac{\gamma rt\cos(\phi)}{2\eta}}$

Where $\phi$ is the contact angle between the penetrating liquid and the solid (tube wall).

Washburn's equation is also used commonly to determine the contact angle of a liquid to a powder using a force tensiometer.

In the case of porous materials, many issues have been raised both about the physical meaning of the calculated pore radius $r$ and the real possibility to use this equation for the calculation of the contact angle of the solid. The equation is derived for capillary flow in a cylindrical tube in the absence of a gravitational field, but is sufficiently accurate in many cases when the capillary force is still significantly greater than the gravitational force.

In his paper from 1921 Washburn applies Poiseuille's Law for fluid motion in a circular tube. Inserting the expression for the differential volume in terms of the length $l$ of fluid in the tube $dV=\pi r^2 dl$, one obtains

$$\frac{\delta l}{\delta t}=\frac{\sum P}{8\eta l}(r^2 +4 \epsilon r)$$

where $\sum P$ is the sum over the participating pressures, such as the atmospheric pressure $P_A$, the hydrostatic pressure $P_h$ and the equivalent pressure due to capillary forces $P_c$. $\eta$ is the viscosity of the liquid, and $\epsilon$ is the coefficient of slip, which is assumed to be 0 for wetting materials. $r$ is the radius of the capillary. The pressures in turn can be written as

$$P_h=h g \rho - l g \rho\sin\psi$$
$$P_c=\frac{2\gamma}{r}\cos\phi$$

where $\rho$ is the density of the liquid and $\gamma$ its surface tension. $\psi$ is the angle of the tube with respect to the horizontal axis. $\phi$ is the contact angle of the liquid on the capillary material. Substituting these expressions leads to the first-order differential equation for the distance the fluid penetrates into the tube $l$:

$$\frac{\delta l}{\delta t}=\frac{[P_A+g \rho (h-l\sin\psi)+\frac{2\gamma}{r}\cos\phi](r^2 +4 \epsilon r)}{8\eta l}$$

=== Washburn's constant ===
The Washburn constant may be included in Washburn's equation.

It is calculated as follows:

$\frac{10^4 \left[ \mathrm{\frac{\mu m}{cm}} \right] \left[ \mathrm{\frac{N}{m^2}} \right]}{68947.6 \left[ \mathrm{\frac{dynes}{cm^2}} \right]} = 0.1450(38)$

=== Fluid inertia ===
In the derivation of Washburn's equation, the inertia of the liquid is ignored as negligible. This is apparent in the dependence of length $L$ to the square root of time, $L \propto \sqrt{t}$, which gives an arbitrarily large velocity dL/dt for small values of t. An improved version of Washburn's equation, called Bosanquet equation, takes the inertia of the liquid into account.

== Applications ==
=== Inkjet printing ===
The penetration of a liquid into the substrate flowing under its own capillary pressure can be calculated using a simplified version of Washburn's equation:

$$l = \left[ \frac{r\cos\theta}{2} \right]^{\frac{1}{2}} \left[ \frac{\gamma}{\eta} \right]^{\frac{1}{2}} t^{\frac{1}{2}}$$

where the surface tension-to-viscosity ratio $\left[ \tfrac{\gamma}{\eta} \right]^{\frac{1}{2}}$ represents the speed of ink penetration into the substrate. In reality, the evaporation of solvents limits the extent of liquid penetration in a porous layer and thus, for the meaningful modelling of inkjet printing physics it is appropriate to utilise models which account for evaporation effects in limited capillary penetration.

=== Food ===
According to physicist and Ig Nobel prize winner Len Fisher, the Washburn equation can be extremely accurate for more complex materials including biscuits. Following an informal celebration called national biscuit dunking day, some newspaper articles quoted the equation as Fisher's equation.

=== Novel capillary pump ===
The flow behaviour in traditional capillary follows the Washburn's equation. Recently, novel capillary pumps with a constant pumping flow rate independent of the liquid viscosity were developed, which have a significant advantage over the traditional capillary pump (of which the flow behaviour is Washburn behaviour, namely the flow rate is not constant). These new concepts of capillary pump are of great potential to improve the performance of lateral flow test.

== See also ==
- Bosanquet equation
- Mercury intrusion porosimetry (MIP)
