= Josef Kozeny =

- Born: Josef Alexander Kozeny; February 25, 1889; Josefov Fortress
- Died: April 19, 1967 (aged 78)
- Occupation: Hydraulic engineer
- Known for: Kozeny–Carman equation

Josef Alexander Kozeny (February 25, 1889 – April 19, 1967) was an Austrian hydraulic engineer and physicist. Today he is mainly remembered for the Kozeny–Carman equation which describes fluid flowing through a packed bed of solids.

== Education ==
Born in Josefstadt, Bohemia, Kozeny moved to Prague to study at the German Technical University. He later moved to Vienna to study at the University of Agricultural Sciences.

== Career ==
In 1922, he was appointed professor at the University of Tartu in Estonia. In 1924, he became a professor at the University of Agricultural Sciences in Vienna. In 1929 he got a second habilitation, this time at College of Technology (TH Wien), now TU Wien. Since 1930 he had lectures at TH Wien. In 1935 he lectured „Wasserbau III - Anlagen des städt. Tiefbaus und ldw. Wasserbau“, „Enzyklop. der Ing.wissenschaften für Architektur“ and „Enzyklop. der Ing.wissensch. für Vermessungswesen“ at TH Wien. On the first January 1940 he got außerordentlicher Professor, of Hydraulics and Hydraulic Engineering („Verkehrswasserbau, städt. Tiefbau und ldw. Wasserbau“) at TH Wien. On the first of February 1941 he got ordentlicher Professor at TH Wien. He was designated Professor Emeritus in 1959.

He became a member of the Austrian Academy of Sciences in 1958 and received an honorary doctorate in 1965.

Kozeny published a textbook, “Hydraulics”, in 1953, a book which became a standard in the field. He was best known for his contribution to the Kozeny-Carman equation. Used to calculate the flow of a liquid through a packed bed of solids, the equation was first proposed by Kozeny in 1927 and later modified by Philip Carman.
