= Ergun equation =

Relation between friction factor and Reynolds number

The Ergun equation, derived by the Turkish chemical engineer Sabri Ergun in 1952, expresses the friction factor in a packed column as a function of the modified Reynolds number.

== Equation ==
$$f_p = \frac {150}{Gr_p}+1.75$$

where:

- $f_p = \frac{\Delta p}{L} \frac{D_p}{\rho v_s^2} \left(\frac{\epsilon^3}{1-\epsilon}\right),$
- $Gr_p = \frac{\rho v_s D_p}{(1-\epsilon)\mu} = \frac{Re}{(1-\epsilon)},$
- $Gr_p$ is the modified Reynolds number,
- $f_p$ is the packed bed friction factor,
- $\Delta p$ is the pressure drop across the bed,
- $L$ is the length of the bed (not the column),
- $D_p$ is the equivalent spherical diameter of the packing,
- $\rho$ is the density of fluid,
- $\mu$ is the dynamic viscosity of the fluid,
- $v_s$ is the superficial velocity (i.e. the velocity that the fluid would have through the empty tube at the same volumetric flow rate),
- $\epsilon$ is the void fraction (porosity) of the bed, and
- $Re$ is the particle Reynolds Number (based on superficial velocity)..

== Extension ==
To calculate the pressure drop in a given reactor, the following equation may be deduced:

$$\Delta p = \frac{150\mu ~L}{D_p^2} ~\frac{(1-\epsilon)^2}{\epsilon^3}v_s + \frac{1.75~L~\rho}{D_p}~ \frac{(1-\epsilon)}{\epsilon^3}v_s|v_s|.$$

This arrangement of the Ergun equation makes clear its close relationship to the simpler Kozeny-Carman equation, which describes laminar flow of fluids across packed beds via the first term on the right hand side. On the continuum level, the second-order velocity term demonstrates that the Ergun equation also includes the pressure drop due to inertia, as described by the Darcy–Forchheimer equation. Specifically, the Ergun equation gives the following permeability $k$ and inertial permeability $k_1$ from the Darcy-Forchheimer law:
$$k = \frac{D_p^2}{150} ~\frac{\epsilon^3}{(1-\epsilon)^2},$$
and
$$k_1 = \frac{D_p}{1.75} ~\frac{\epsilon^3}{1-\epsilon}.$$

The extension of the Ergun equation to fluidized beds, where the solid particles flow with the fluid, is discussed by Akgiray and Saatçı (2001).

== See also ==
- Hagen–Poiseuille equation
- Kozeny–Carman equation
