= Kozeny–Carman equation =

Relation used in the field of fluid dynamics

The Kozeny–Carman equation (or Carman–Kozeny equation or Kozeny equation) is a relation used in the field of fluid dynamics to calculate the pressure drop of a fluid flowing through a packed bed of solids. It is named after Josef Kozeny and Philip C. Carman. The equation is only valid for creeping flow, i.e. in the slowest limit of laminar flow. The equation was derived by Kozeny (1927) and Carman (1937, 1956) from a starting point of (a) modelling fluid flow in a packed bed as laminar fluid flow in a collection of curving passages/tubes crossing the packed bed and (b) Poiseuille's law describing laminar fluid flow in straight, circular section pipes.

== Equation ==
The equation is given as:

$$\frac{\Delta P}{L} = \frac{150 \mu}{\mathit{\Phi}_\mathrm{s}^2 d_\mathrm{p}^2}\frac{(1-\varepsilon)^2}{\varepsilon^3}V_\mathrm{0}$$

where:

- $\Delta P$ is the pressure drop;
- $L$ is the total height of the bed;
- $\mu$ is the viscosity of the fluid;
- $\varepsilon$ is the porosity of the bed ($\simeq 0.37$ for randomly packed spheres);
- $\mathit{\Phi}_\mathrm{s}$ is the sphericity of the particles in the packed bed ($\mathit{\Phi}_\mathrm{s}$ = 1.0 for spherical particles);
- $d_\mathrm{p}$ is the diameter of the volume equivalent spherical particle;
- $V_\mathrm{0}$ is the superficial or "empty-tower" velocity which is directly proportional to the average volumetric fluid flux in the channels (q), and porosity ($\mathbf{\varepsilon}$).

This equation holds for flow through packed beds with particle Reynolds numbers up to approximately 1.0, after which point frequent shifting of flow channels in the bed causes considerable kinetic energy losses.

This equation is a particular case of Darcy's law, with a very specific permeability. Darcy's law states that "flow is proportional to the pressure gradient and inversely proportional to the fluid viscosity" and is given as:

q $= \frac{\kappa}{\mu} \frac{\Delta P}{L}$

Combining these equations gives the final Kozeny equation for absolute (single phase) permeability:

$$\kappa = \mathit{\Phi}_\mathrm{s}^2 \frac {\varepsilon^3 d_\mathrm{p}^2}{150(1-\varepsilon)^2}$$

where:

- $\kappa$ is the absolute (i.e., single phase) permeability.

== History ==
The equation was first proposed by Kozeny (1927) and later modified by Carman (1937, 1956). A similar equation was derived independently by Fair and Hatch in 1933. A comprehensive review of other equations has been published.

== See also ==
- Fractionating column
- Random close pack
- Raschig ring
- Ergun equation
