= Henry Darcy =

French engineer (1803–1858)

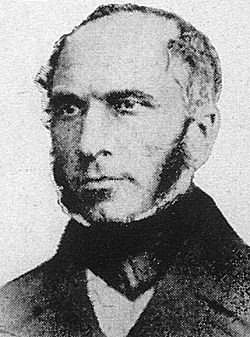
- Henry Darcy
- Born: 10 June 1803; Dijon
- Died: 3 January 1858 (aged 54); Paris
- Education: École Polytechnique; École des Ponts et Chaussées
- Known for: Darcy's law Darcy–Weisbach equation
- Awards: Légion d'honneur
- Scientific career
- Fields: Hydraulics

Henry Philibert Gaspard Darcy (French: [ɑ̃ʁi daʁsi]; 10 June 1803 – 3 January 1858) was a French engineer who made several important contributions to hydraulics, including Darcy's law for flow in porous media.

== Early life ==
Darcy was born in Dijon, France, on June 10, 1803. His first given name is Henry; although the French spelling Henri appears in multiple sources such as necrological notices, Darcy used the Anglicized spelling.

Despite his father's death in 1817 when he was 14, his mother was able to borrow money to pay for his tutors. In 1821 he enrolled at the École Polytechnique (Polytechnic School) in Paris, and transferred two years later to the School of Bridges and Roads, which led to employment in the Corps of Bridges and Roads.

Darcy met an English woman, Henriette Carey, whose family had been living in Dijon, and married her in 1828.

== Engineering career ==
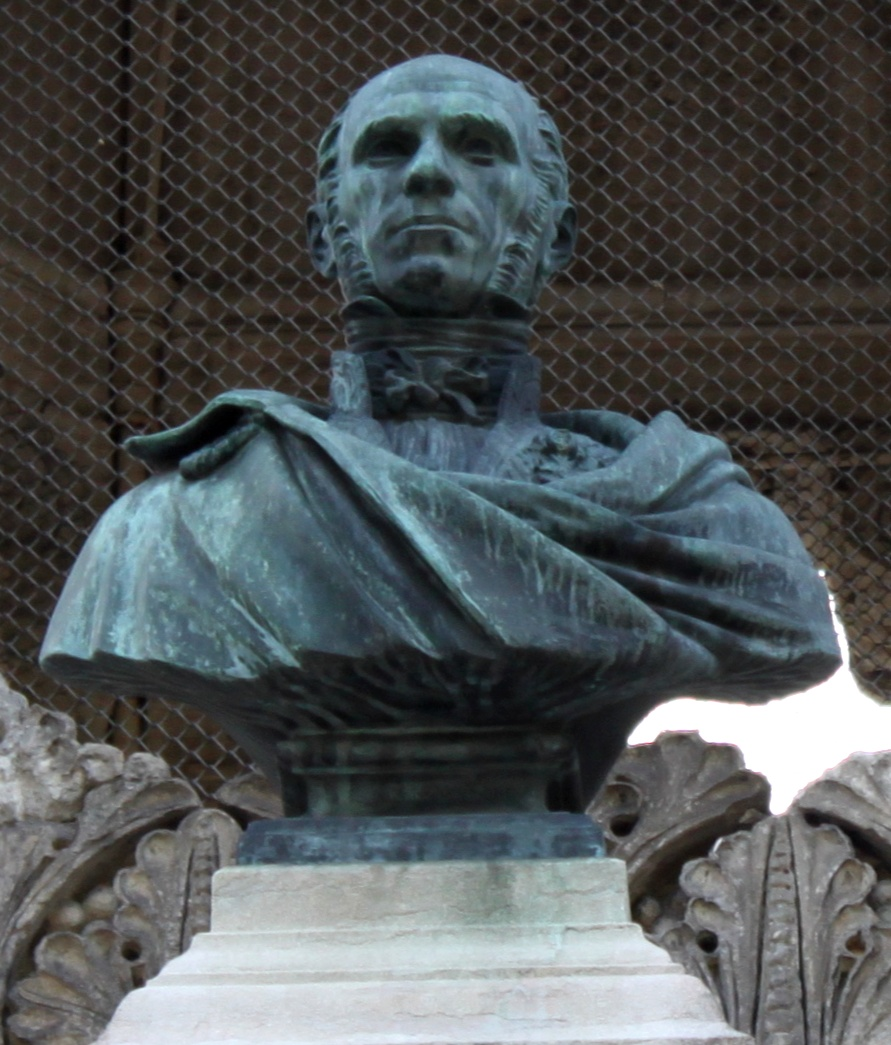
Darcy's bust in the Jardin Darcy, Dijon

As a member of the Corps, he built an adequate pressurized water distribution system in Dijon following the failure of attempts to supply adequate fresh water by drilling wells. The system carried water from Rosoir Spring 12.7 kilometres (7.9 mi) away through a covered aqueduct (watercourse) to reservoirs near the city, which then fed into a network of 28,000 meters of pressurized pipes delivering water to much of the city. The system was fully closed and driven by gravity, and thus required no pumps with just sand acting as a filter. He was also involved in many other public works in and around Dijon, as well as in the politics of the Dijon city government.

During this period he modified the Prony equation for calculating head loss due to friction, which after further modification by Julius Weisbach would become the well-known Darcy–Weisbach equation still in use today.

In 1848 he became Chief Engineer for the département of which Dijon is the capital. Soon thereafter he left Dijon due to political pressure, but was promoted to Chief Director for Water and Pavements and took up office in Paris. While in that position, he was able to focus more on his hydraulics research, especially on flow and friction losses in pipes. During this period he improved the design of the Pitot tube, into essentially the form used today.

He resigned from his post in 1855 due to poor health but was permitted to continue his research in Dijon. In 1855 and 1856 he conducted experiments where water flowed through a column filled with sand that established what has become known as Darcy's law; initially developed to describe flow through sands, it has since been generalized to a variety of situations and is in widespread use today e.g. for calculating the resistance of any type of porous media flow. The unit of measure of material permeability, the darcy is named in his honour.

Darcy died of pneumonia while on a trip to Paris in 1858 and is buried in Cimetière de Dijon (formerly known as Péjoces) in Dijon.

== Publications ==
Place Darcy, Dijon, named after Henry Darcy

- Les fontaines publiques de la ville de Dijon: exposition et application ... Victor Dalmont. 1856.
- Darcy, Henry-Philibert-Gaspard (1857). Recherches expérimentales relatives au mouvement de l'eau dans les tuyaux. Impr. Impériale.
- Darcy, Henri; Bazin, Henry (1865). Recherches hydrauliques: Recherches expérimentales sur l'écoulement de l'eau dans les canaux découverts (1ère partie ed.). Dunod.
- Darcy, Henri; Bazin, Henry (1865). Recherches hydrauliques entreprises par M. Henry Darcy continuées par M. Henri Bazin (Deuxième partie. Recherches expérimentales relatives au remous et à la propagation des ondes ed.). Paris: Imprimerie impériale.

== See also ==
- Darcy (unit)
- Darcy friction factor formulae
- Darcy number
- Hydrogeology
- Pitot tube
