= Porous medium =

Material containing fluid-filled voids

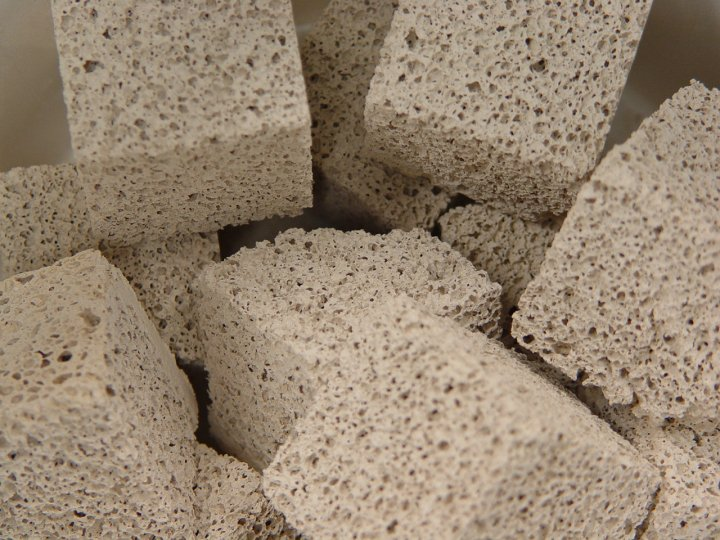
Open-cell ceramic

In materials science, a porous medium or a porous material is a material containing pores (voids). The skeletal portion of the material is often called the "matrix" or "frame". The pores are typically filled with a fluid (liquid or gas). The skeletal material is usually a solid, but structures like foams are often also usefully analyzed using concept of porous media.

A porous medium is most often characterised by its porosity. Other properties of the medium (e.g. permeability, tensile strength, electrical conductivity, tortuosity) can sometimes be derived from the respective properties of its constituents (solid matrix and fluid) and the media porosity and pores structure, but such a derivation is usually complex. Even the concept of porosity is only straightforward for a poroelastic medium.

Often both the solid matrix and the pore network (also known as the pore space) are continuous, so as to form two interpenetrating continua such as in a sponge. However, there is also a concept of closed porosity and effective porosity, i.e. the pore space accessible to flow.

Many natural substances such as rocks and soil (e.g. aquifers, petroleum reservoirs), zeolites, biological tissues (e.g. bones, wood, cork), and man made materials such as cements and ceramics can be considered as porous media. Many of their important properties can only be rationalized by considering them to be porous media.

The concept of porous media is used in many areas of applied science and engineering: filtration, mechanics (acoustics, geomechanics, soil mechanics, rock mechanics), engineering (petroleum engineering, bioremediation, construction engineering), geosciences (hydrogeology, petroleum geology, geophysics), biology and biophysics, material science. Two important current fields of application for porous materials are energy conversion and energy storage, where porous materials are essential for supercapacitors, (photo-)catalysis, fuel cells, and batteries.

== Scale ==
At the microscopic and macroscopic levels, porous media can be classified. At the microscopic scale, the structure is represented statistically by the distribution of pore sizes, the degree of pore interconnection and orientation, the proportion of dead pores, etc. The macroscopic technique makes use of bulk properties that have been averaged at scales far bigger than pore size.

Depending on the goal, these two techniques are frequently employed since they are complimentary. It is obvious that the microscopic description is required to comprehend surface phenomena like the adsorption of macromolecules from polymer solutions and the blocking of pores, whereas the macroscopic approach is frequently quite sufficient for process design where fluid flow, heat, and mass transfer are of highest concern. and the molecular dimensions are significantly smaller than pore size of the porous system.

== Fluid flow ==
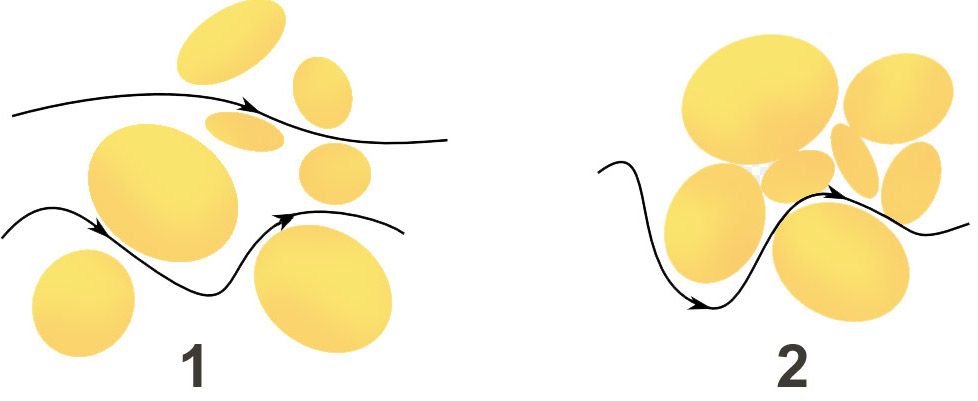
Fluid flow through porous media

Fluid flow through porous media is a subject of common interest and has emerged a separate field of study. The study of more general behaviour of porous media involving deformation of the solid frame is called poromechanics.

The theory of porous flows has applications in inkjet printing and nuclear waste disposal technologies, among others.

Numerous factors influence fluid flow in porous media, and its fundamental function is to expend energy and create fluid via the wellbore. In flow mechanics via porous medium, the connection between energy and flow rate becomes the most significant issue. The most fundamental law that characterizes this connection is Darcy's law, particularly applicable to fine-porous media. In contrast, Forchheimer's law finds utility in the context of coarse-porous media.

== Models ==
A representation of the void phase that exists inside porous materials using a set or network of pores. It serves as a structural foundation for the prediction of transport parameters and is employed in the context of pore structure characterisation.

There are many idealized models of pore structures. They can be broadly divided into three categories:

- networks of capillaries
- arrays of solid particles (e.g., random close pack of spheres)
- trimodal

Porous materials often have a fractal-like structure, having a pore surface area that seems to grow indefinitely when viewed with progressively increasing resolution. Mathematically, this is described by assigning the pore surface a Hausdorff dimension greater than 2. Experimental methods for the investigation of pore structures include confocal microscopy and x-ray tomography. Porous materials have found some applications in many engineering fields including automotive sectors.

== Laws ==
One of the Laws for porous materials is the generalized Murray's law. The generalized Murray's law is based on optimizing mass transfer by minimizing transport resistance in pores with a given volume, and can be applicable for optimizing mass transfer involving mass variations and chemical reactions involving flow processes, molecule or ion diffusion.

For connecting a parent pipe with radius of r_{0} to many children pipes with radius of r_{i} , the formula of generalized Murray's law is: $r_o^a={1 \over 1-X}\sum_{i=1}^Nr_i^a$, where the X is the ratio of mass variation during mass transfer in the parent pore, the exponent α is dependent on the type of the transfer. For laminar flow α =3; for turbulent flow α =7/3; for molecule or ionic diffusion α =2; etc.

== See also ==
- Cenocell
- Nanoporous materials
- NMR in porous media
- Percolation theory
- Percolation threshold
- Reticulated foam
- Filtration
- Poromechanics
- Reactive transport
- Permeability
- Macropore
