= Mark Flood =

Mark Flood may refer to:

- Mark Flood (ice hockey) (born 1984), Canadian ice hockey player
- Mark Flood (artist) (born 1957), American artist
- Mark Ellis, known as Flood (producer) (born 1960), British audio engineer/music producer

== See also ==
- Flood (surname)
- Flood (disambiguation)
