= Deluge =

A deluge is a large downpour of rain, often a flood.

The Deluge refers to the flood narrative in the biblical book of Genesis.

Deluge or Le Déluge may also refer to:

== History ==
- Deluge (history), the Swedish and Russian invasion of the Polish-Lithuanian Commonwealth (1654–1667)
- Deluge (prehistoric), prehistoric great floods, some of which may have inspired deluge myths
- Après moi, le déluge (lit. 'After me, the flood'), a French expression attributed to King Louis XV of France in 1757

== Arts, entertainment, and media ==
=== Films ===
- Deluge (film), a 1933 post-apocalyptic science fiction film loosely based on the S. Fowler Wright novel
- The Deluge (film), a 1974 Polish film based on the Sienkiewicz novel
- Le Déluge (film) or The Flood, a 2024 French-Italian historical drama film

=== Literature ===
- Deluge (novel), a 1928 novel by S. Fowler Wright
- Deluge, a 2008 novel by Anne McCaffrey and Elizabeth Anne Sarborough
- The Flood (Le Clézio novel) (French: Le Déluge), a 1966 novel by J. M. G. Le Clézio
- The Deluge (Tooze book), a 2014 book by Adam Tooze
- The Deluge (novel), Potop, an 1886 novel by Nobel Prize winner Henryk Sienkiewicz about the historical event
- The Deluge, a 1954 pastiche story credited to Leonardo da Vinci, actually written by Robert Payne
- The Deluge, a 2007 novel by Mark Morris
- The Deluge, a 2023 novel about dystopian climate change by Stephen Markley

=== Music ===
- Deluge, a 1997 album by Jocelyn Pook
- Le Déluge (Saint-Saëns), an 1875 oratorio by Camille Saint-Saëns
- The Deluge (Manilla Road album), 1986
- The Deluge (William Basinski album), 2015
- The Deluge (Fanning Dempsey National Park album), 2024

=== Other uses in arts, entertainment, and media ===
- The Deluge (painting), an 1805 painting by J.M.W. Turner
- The Deluge (Martin), an 1834 painting by John Martin
- Deluge (fine art photography), a museum exhibit by David LaChapelle
- Deluge (Transformers), several Transformers characters
- The Deluge, a painting by Winifred Knights
- "The Deluge" (Knots Landing), a 1985 television episode

== Firefighting ==
- Deluge (fireboat), several vessels
- A type of fire sprinkler system
- Deluge gun, equipment used in firefighting

== Other uses ==
- Le Déluge, a former commune in the Oise department, France
- Deluge (software), a cross-platform BitTorrent client written using Python and GTK
- Deluge Fountain, in Bydgoszcz, Poland
- Deluge Mountain, a summit in Canada

== See also ==
- Flood (disambiguation)
- Flood myth, mythic floods in general
