= Multiphase =

Multiphase may refer to

- Multiphase flow, in fluid mechanics, the simultaneous flow of either a) materials with different states or phases or b) materials with different chemical properties but in the same state or phase
- Multiphase heat transfer
- Multiphase media in materials physics
