= Slip ratio (gas–liquid flow) =

Slip ratio (or velocity ratio) in gas–liquid (two-phase) flow, is defined as the ratio of the velocity of the gas phase to the velocity of the liquid phase.

In the homogeneous model of two-phase flow, the slip ratio is by definition assumed to be unity (no slip). It is however experimentally observed that the velocity of the gas and liquid phases can be significantly different, depending on the flow pattern (e.g. plug flow, annular flow, bubble flow, stratified flow, slug flow, churn flow). The models that account for the existence of the slip are called "separated flow models".

The following identities can be written using the interrelated definitions:

$$S = \frac {u_G} {u_L} = \frac {U_G(1-\epsilon_G)} {U_L \epsilon_G} = \frac {\rho_L x (1-\epsilon_G)} {\rho_G(1-x) \epsilon_G}$$

where:

- S – slip ratio, dimensionless
- indices G and L refer to the gas and the liquid phase, respectively
- u – velocity, m/s
- U – superficial velocity, m/s
- $\epsilon$ – void fraction, dimensionless
- ρ – density of a phase, kg/m^{3}
- x – steam quality, dimensionless.

== Correlations for the slip ratio ==
There are a number of correlations for slip ratio.

For homogeneous flow, S = 1 (i.e. there is no slip).

The Chisholm correlation is:

$S = \sqrt {1 -x \left(1 - \frac {\rho_L} {\rho_G} \right)}$

The Chisholm correlation is based on application of the simple annular flow model and equates the frictional pressure drops in the liquid and the gas phase.

The slip ratio for two-phase cross-flow horizontal tube bundles may be determined using the following correlation:

$S=1+25.7 \sqrt{Ri\cdot Ca}\cdot\bigl(P/D)^{-1}$ where the Richardson and capillary numbers are defined as $Ri=\frac{(\rho_l-\rho_g)^{2}\cdot g\cdot y_{min}}{G^{2}}$ and $Ca=\frac{\mu_l}{\sigma}\left ( \frac{x\cdot G}{\epsilon\cdot\rho_g} \right )$.

For enhanced surfaces bundles the slip ratio can be defined as:

$S=6.71\sqrt{(Ri\cdot Ca)}$

Where:

- S – slip ratio, dimensionless
- P – tube centerline pitch
- D – tube diameter
- Subscript $l$– liquid phase
- Subscript $g$– gas phase
- g– gravitational acceleration
- $y_{min}$– minimum distance between the tubes
- G-mass flux (mass flow per unit area)
- $\mu$– dynamic viscosity
- $\sigma$– surface tension
- $x$– thermodynamic quality
- $\epsilon$– void fraction
