= Hulda =

Hulda/Holda and Huldah may refer to:

== People ==
- Hulda (given name)
- Hulda (poet), Icelandic poet
- Huldah, prophetess from the Hebrew Bible/Old Testament
- Hulda of Bohemia, semi-legendary "witch" of Sleepy Hollow

== Other uses ==
- Hulda, a genus of moth
- Hulda (opera), by César Franck
- Hulda, Israel, a kibbutz in Israel
- Hulda-Hrokkinskinna, an Icelandic manuscript
- Mother Hulda, a German folk tale
- Holda, a character in Germanic folklore
