= Flood (disambiguation) =

A flood is an overflow or accumulation of an expanse of water that submerges land.

Flood(s), The Flood, Flooded or Flooding may also refer to:

== Mythology ==
- Flood myth
- Genesis flood narrative, a flood myth found in the Bible

== Places ==
- Flood, British Columbia, Canada

== Literature ==
- The Flood (Al-Fayḍān), a 1975 short story collection by Haidar Haidar
- Flood (Baxter novel), a 2008 novel by Stephen Baxter
- Halo: The Flood, a 2003 novel by William C. Dietz
- Flood (Doyle novel), a 2002 novel by Richard Doyle
- The Flood (Le Clézio novel), a 1966 novel by J. M. G. Le Clézio
- The Flood (Rankin novel), a 1986 novel by Ian Rankin
- The Flood (novella), an 1880 novella by Émile Zola
- The Flood, a 2004 novel by Maggie Gee
- Flood, a 2002 novel by James Heneghan
- Floods, a 2000 volume of poetry by Maurice Riordan
- Flood, a 1985 novel in the Burke series by Andrew Vachss
- Flood: A Romance of Our Time, a 1964 novel by Robert Penn Warren

== Film and television ==
- The Flood (1927 film), a German silent film
- The Flood (1931 film), American film directed by James Tinling
- The Flood (1958 film), a Czech film
- The Flood (1962 film), an American television film narrated by Laurence Harvey
- The Flood (1963 film), children's adventure film written by Jean Scott Rogers
- Flood!, a 1976 American television film
- The Flood: Who Will Save Our Children? a 1993 American film based on real events.
- The Flood (1994 film), a French-Russian film
- Flood (2007 film), a 2007 British-Canadian disaster film about a flood engulfing London.
- Flood (2017 film), a 2017 Canadian animated short film by Amanda Strong
- The Flood (2010 film) or Mabul, an Israeli film
- The Flood (2019 film), a British drama film directed by Anthony Woodley
- The Flood (2020 film), an Australian drama film directed by Victoria Wharfe McIntyre
- The Flood (2022 film), a Russian drama film directed by Ivan Tverdovskiy
- The Flood (2024 film), a French-Italian film directed by Gianluca Jodice
- Flood (2025 film), a Slovak film directed by Martin Gonda
- "Flooded" (Buffy the Vampire Slayer), a 2001 TV episode
- "Flood" (Barbara), a 2002 TV episode
- "Flood" (The Young Ones), a 1982 TV episode
- "The Flood" (Mad Men), a 2013 TV episode
- The Flood, a fictional entity in the Doctor Who universe

== Music ==
- The Flood (band), an Australian band
- Flood (producer) or Mark Ellis (born 1960), record producer
- Flooding (band), an American band

=== Albums ===
- Flood (Boris album) (2000)
- Flood (Jeremy Fisher album) (2010)
- The Flood (Gospel Gangstaz album) (2006)
- Flood (Headswim album) (1994)
- Flood (Herbie Hancock album) (1975)
- Flood (Kreidler album) (2019)
- Flood (Moka Only album) (2002)
- The Flood (Of Mice & Men album) (2011)
- Flood (Keren Peles album) (2008)
- Flood (They Might Be Giants album) (1990)
- Flood (Stella Donnelly album) (2022)
- Flood, a 1999 album by Jocelyn Pook
- Flood, a 2001 album by Raining Pleasure

=== Songs ===
- "The Flood" (Cheryl song) (2010)
- "Floods" (Fightstar song) (2008)
- "Flood" (Jars of Clay song) (1995)
- "The Flood" (Katie Melua song) (2010)
- "Floods" (Pantera song) (1996)
- "The Flood" (Take That song) (2010)
- "Floods", a song by Abigail Williams from In the Shadow of a Thousand Suns
- "The Flood", a song by Beyond the Black from Break the Silence
- "Flood", a song by Bright from Bells Break Their Towers
- "The Flood", a song by Escape the Fate from This War Is Ours
- "Flood", a song by the Feelers from Communicate
- "The Flood", a song by Godley & Creme from Consequences
- "The Flood", a song by the Haunted from The Dead Eye
- "The Flood", a song by In Hearts Wake from Incarnation
- "The Flood", a song by Leprous from The Congregation
- "The Flood", a song by Mushroomhead from A Wonderful Life
- "Flood", a song by Neurosis from Sovereign
- "Flood I", a song by the Sisters of Mercy from Floodland
- "Flood II", a song by the Sisters of Mercy from Floodland
- "The Flood", a song by the Soundtrack of Our Lives from Behind the Music
- "Flood", a song by Tool from Undertow
- "The Flood", a song by Wolfheart from Tyhjyys

== Musical theater ==
- The Flood (Stravinsky), a 1962 musical play by Igor Stravinsky
- The Flood, a 2001 musical by Peter Mills and Cara Reichel

== Computing ==
- Flood fill, an algorithm that determines the area connected to a given node in a multi-dimensional array
- Flooding (computer networking)
- IRC flood, a form of denial-of-service attack
- MAC flooding, a technique employed to compromise the security of network switches
- Network flood, a denial-of-service attack on a network

== Video games ==
- Flood (Halo), fictional creatures in the Halo game series
- Flood (video game), a 1990 game for Amiga and Atari ST

== Other uses ==
- Flood (surname), a surname (includes a list)
- Flooding (Australian football), a sports tactic
- Flooding (nuclear reactor core)
- Flooding (psychology), a psychotherapeutic technique
- Flooding algorithm, methods for distributing material in a graph

== See also ==
- Flood v. Kuhn, a U.S. Supreme Court decision
- Flooded engine, an engine fed too much or too rich fuel
- Floodlight, an artificial light
- Fludd (disambiguation)
