= After the Deluge =

After the Deluge may refer to:

- After the Deluge (film), an Australian television film broadcast in two parts
- After the Deluge (painting), a painting by George Frederic Watts

== See also ==
- After the Flood (disambiguation)
- Après le Déluge
- Après moi, le déluge
- Before the Deluge
- Deluge (disambiguation)
- Light and Colour (Goethe's Theory) – The Morning after the Deluge – Moses Writing the Book of Genesis, a painting by J. M. W. Turner
- The Subsiding of the Waters of the Deluge, a painting by Thomas Cole
