= Flood (surname) =

Flood is a traditional Irish and Scottish surname and may refer to:

== Academia ==
- Colleen M. Flood (fl. since 1997), Canadian law professor
- Merrill M. Flood (1908–1991), American mathematician and management scientist
- Michael Flood (fl. since 1999), Australian sociologist
- Robert L. Flood (born 1955), British management scientist

== Arts and entertainment ==
- Alexandra Flood (born 1990), Australian operatic soprano, sister of Georgia Flood
- Ann Flood (1932–2022), American actress
- Georgia Flood, Australian actress, sister of Alexandra Flood
- Gerald Flood (1927–1989), British actor
- Mark Flood (artist) (born 1957), American artist (a.k.a. singer Perry Webb)
- Richard Flood (born 1982), Irish actor
- Sonny Flood (born 1989), British actor
- W. H. Grattan Flood (1857–1928), Irish musicologist, historian, and author

== Politics ==
- Chris Flood (born 1947), Irish politician (Fianna Fáil, Dublin South-West)
- Daniel J. Flood (1903–1994), American politician (Democrat, Pennsylvania)
- Dennis Flood, American politician, mayor of Irvington, NY, 1994–2006
- Edward Flood (1805–1888), Australian politician
- Henry Flood (1732–1791), Irish politician
- Hulda Flood (1886–1968), Swedish politician
- Mike Flood (politician) (born 1975), American politician (Republican, Nebraska)
- Sarah Flood-Beaubrun (born 1969), Saint Lucian lawyer and politician
- Warden Flood (1694–1764), Irish judge and politician, MP for Callan 1727–1760, Lord Chief Justice 1760–1764
- Warden Flood (1735–1797), Irish politician, MP 1769–1797 for Longford Borough, Carysfort, Baltinglass, then Taghmon; nephew of the judge

== Sport ==
- Anthony Flood (born 1984), Irish footballer
- Curt Flood (1938–1997), American baseball player
- Lisa Flood (born 1971), Canadian swimmer
- Mark Flood (ice hockey) (born 1984), Canadian defenceman
- Stacey Flood (5 August 1996), Irish rugby union player
- Toby Flood (born 1985), English rugby union player
- Willo Flood (born 1985), Irish footballer

== Other fields ==
- Emmet Flood, American attorney
- Frank Flood (1901–1921), Irish war of independence soldier
- James Clair Flood, (1826–1889), American businessman
- Liam Flood (c. 1943 – 2014), Irish bookmaker and poker player
- Mark Flood (disambiguation), several people
- Martin Flood (born 1964), Australian quiz–show winner
- Mike Flood (Fireman Sam), a character in Fireman Sam
- Philip Flood (born 1935), Australian diplomat
- Zoe Flood, independent journalist and filmmaker

== See also ==
- Mark Ellis (born 1960), British record producer known professionally as "Flood"; see Flood (producer)
- Media related to Flood (surname) at Wikimedia Commons
