= Slugcatcher =

Pipeline component

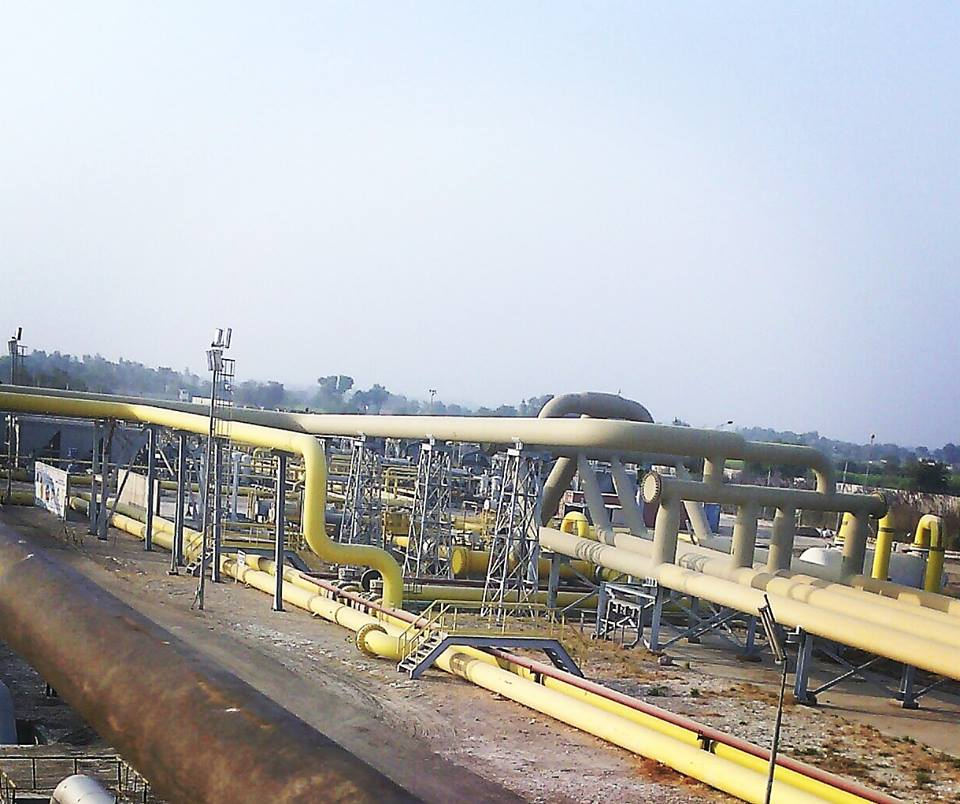
Finger type slug catcher at the Qadirpur Gas Field

A slugcatcher is a unit in a gas refinery (or other aspect of the petroleum industry) in which "slugs" are collected or caught at the outlet of pipelines. A slug is a large quantity of a liquid that exists in a multi-phase pipeline.

== Slugs ==
Pipelines that transport both gas and liquids together, known as two-phase flow, can operate in a flow regime known as slugging flow or slug flow. Under the influence of gravity, liquids will tend to settle on the bottom of the pipeline, while the gases occupy the top section of the pipeline. Under certain operating conditions gas and liquid are not evenly distributed throughout the pipeline, but travel as large plugs with mostly liquids or mostly gases through the pipeline. These large plugs are called slugs.

Slugs exiting the pipeline can overload the gas/liquid handling capacity of the plant at the pipeline outlet, as they are often produced at a much larger rate than the equipment is designed for.

Slugs can be generated by different mechanisms in a pipeline:

- Terrain slugging is caused by the elevations in the pipeline, which follows the ground elevation or the sea bed. Liquid can accumulate at a low point of the pipeline until sufficient pressure builds up behind it. Once the liquid is pushed out of the low point, it can form a slug.
- Hydrodynamic slugging is caused by gas flowing at a fast rate over a slower flowing liquid phase. The gas will form waves on the liquid surface, which may grow to bridge the whole cross-section of the line. This creates a blockage on the gas flow, which travels as a slug through the line.
- Riser-based slugging, also known as severe slugging, is associated with the pipeline risers often found in offshore oil production facilities. Liquids accumulate at the bottom of the riser until sufficient pressure is generated behind it to push the liquids over the top of the riser, overcoming the static head. Behind this slug of liquid follows a slug of gas, until sufficient liquids have accumulated at the bottom to form a new liquid slug.
- Pigging slugs are caused by pigging operations in the pipeline. The pig is designed to push all or most of the liquids contents of the pipeline to the outlet. This intentionally creates a liquid slug.

Slugs formed by terrain slugging, hydrodynamic slugging or riser-based slugging are periodical in nature. Whether a slug is able to reach the outlet of the pipeline depends on the rate at which liquids are added to the slug at the front (i.e. in the direction of flow) and the rate at which liquids leave the slug at the back. Some slugs will grow as they travel the pipeline, while others are damped and disappear before reaching the outlet of the pipeline.

== Purpose of the slug catcher ==
A slug catcher is a vessel with sufficient buffer volume to store the largest slugs expected from the upstream system. The slug catcher is located between the outlet of the pipeline and the processing equipment. The buffered liquids can be drained to the processing equipment at a much slower rate to prevent overloading the system. As slugs are a periodical phenomenon, the slug catcher should be emptied before the next slug arrives

Slug catchers can be used continuously or on-demand. A slug catcher permanently connected to the pipeline will buffer all production, including the slugs, before it is sent to the gas and liquid handling facilities. This is used for difficult to predict slugging behaviour found in terrain slugging, hydrodynamic slugging or riser-based slugging. Alternatively, the slug catcher can be bypassed in normal operation and be brought online when a slug is expected, usually during pigging operations. An advantage of this set-up is that inspection and maintenance on the slug catcher can be done without interrupting the normal operation.

== Slug catcher types ==
Slug catchers are designed in different forms,

- A vessel type slug catcher is essentially a conventional vessel. This type is simple in design and maintenance.
- A finger type slug catcher consists of several long pieces of pipe ('fingers'), which together form the buffer volume. The advantage of this type of slug catcher is that pipe segments are simpler to design for high pressures, which are often encountered in pipeline systems, than a large vessel. A disadvantage is that its footprint can become excessively large. An example of a large finger-type slug catcher can be seen in Den Helder, The Netherlands, using Google Maps. The incoming pipeline containing gas and liquid is routed to the inlet of the slug catcher. The inlet comprises a large diameter manifold and splitter section where the gas/liquid is divided into 2, 4, 6 or 8 horizontal pipes of 24, 30, 36, 42 or 48-inch diameter. Gas/liquid separation takes place in these pipes with the liquid dropping to the bottom of the pipes with the gas above. Liquid-free gas is drawn off at the far end of the separation pipes by risers at the top of the pipes. The risers are manifolded together and the gas is routed to further treatment. From the base of the separation pipes liquids flow through down-comers into a further, lower array of horizontal pipes. These pipes slope down away from the inlet, they can typically be 100 to 250 metres in length. The initial section of the lower pipes provides for further gas/liquid separation and the far end provides a buffer storage volume for the liquids which are drawn off at a steady rate for further treatment. The operating pressure in the slug catcher is maintained by a pressure controller and pressure control valve in the gas outlet. The liquid level in the storage end of the slug catcher is controlled by a liquid level controller and level control valve in the liquid outlet.
- A Parking Loop slug catcher combines features of the vessel and finger types. The Gas/Liquid Separation occurs in the Vessel, while the Liquid is stored in the parking loop shaped fingers.
- A Hybrid Slug Catcher combines the high efficiency of a vessel separator and the large storage volume of a harp slug catcher.

== Slug catcher locations ==
Finger type slug catchers are large in size and can be observed on satellite images. The following table is generated using Google Earth and gives an overview of slug catchers in the world. The slug catcher length is determined using measurement tool in Google Earth and is estimated to be +/- 5 meters accurate.

Country	Name	Remark	Bottles	Length [m]	Latitude	Longitude
AR	Rio Cullen Slug Catcher		4	240	-52.90317	-68.35208
AU	Gorgon Slug Catcher 1		12	205	-20.78881	115.44490
AU	Gorgon Slug Catcher 2		14	110	-20.78884	115.44423
AU	Karratha Slug Catcher 1	Volume 5000m3?	14	345	-20.58892	116.77609
AU	Karratha Slug Catcher 2		8	225	-20.58565	116.77904
AU	Karratha Slug Catcher 3		16	315	-20.61163	116.76680
AU	Wheatstone Slug Catcher	Wheatstone LNG Gas plant	24	300	-21.69308	114.99779
AZ	Sangachal Slug Catcher 1	Shan Deniz 1 sub sea pipeline	12	130	40.18900	49.46417
AZ	Sangachal Slug Catcher 2	Shan Deniz 2 sub sea pipeline	8	130	40.19380	49.47019
BN	Slug Catcher 1		8	70	4.66855	114.45955
BN	Slug Catcher 2		6	135	4.66821	114.46046
BN	Slug Catcher 3		18	150	4.67457	114.46744
CN	Zhuhai Gaolan Slug Catcher		28	165	21.88548	113.26463
DK	Slug catcher Nybro		4	115	55.67212	8.36611
EG	Idku Slug Catcher 1		12	103	31.35769	30.32672
EG	Idku Slug Catcher 2		6	170	31.36198	30.33079
EG	Idku Slug Catcher 3		6	125	31.36508	30.33215
EG	Idku Slug Catcher 4		12	88	31.37041	30.32940
EG	Idku Slug Catcher 5		12	103	31.36082	30.32693
EG	Slug Catcher 1		4	115	31.34158	32.10563
EG	Slug Catcher 2		8	215	31.34152	32.10544
EG	Zohr Slug Catcher 1		4	130	31.32071	32.14526
EG	Zohr Slug Catcher 2		4	130	31.32055	32.14516
EG	Zohr Slug Catcher 3		4	130	31.31924	32.14787
EG	Zohr Slug Catcher 4		4	130	31.31909	32.14777
IE	Bellenaboy Bridge Slug Catcher			95	54.23347	-9.74356
IE	Bellenaboy Bridge Slug Catcher			95	54.23347	-9.74356
IL	Sharon Udasin Slug Catcher		4	70	31.84945	34.67977
IR	Slug Catcher	Gas pipeline to Turkey	4	110	39.39665	44.39614
IR	Slug Catcher 1		6	370	27.69140	52.24349
IR	Slug Catcher 2		6	370	27.69140	52.24349
IR	Slug Catcher 3		6	370	27.68851	52.25925
IR	Slug Catcher 4		6	370	27.68851	52.25925
IR	Slug Catcher 5		6	370	27.71659	52.20021
IR	Slug Catcher 6		6	370	27.71659	52.20021
IR	Slug Catcher 7		6	370	27.72653	52.17832
IR	Slug Catcher 8		6	370	27.72653	52.17832
IR	Slug Catcher 9		6	370	27.72653	52.17832
IT	Slug Catcher 1		4	40	37.66730	12.53984
IT	Slug Catcher 2		4	40	37.66730	12.53984
IT	Slug Catcher 3		4	40	37.66730	12.53984
LY	Slug Catcher 1				32.85891	12.24242
LY	Slug Catcher 2				32.85891	12.24242
MO	Tamane Slug Catcher				-21.74701	35.05903
MY	Bintulu Slug Catcher 1				3.28802	113.07969
MY	Bintulu Slug Catcher 2				3.29392	113.08913
MY	Bintulu Slug Catcher 3				3.29329	113.08778
MY	Bintulu Slug Catcher 4				3.28757	113.07892
MY	Kimanis Slug Catcher 1		8	205	5.64175	115.88684
MY	Kimanis Slug Catcher 2		8	205	5.64100	115.88684
NG	Bonny GTS-2/4				4.42326	7.15990
NG	Bonny NLNG GTS-1				4.42411	7.15917
NG	Bonny OGGS GTS-3				4.42405	7.16031
NG	Kwale	Kwale AHL Gas plant			5.72552	6.39195
NL	Harlingen				53.18861	5.43573
NL	NAM				52.92028	4.79385
NL	NAM				52.92028	4.79385
NO	Hammerfest Slug Catcher 1		8	95	70.68409	23.59074
NO	Hammerfest Slug Catcher 2		8	95	70.68199	23.58454
NO	Nyhamna Slug Catcher 1	Ormen Lange gas field	14	160	62.84851	6.93893
NO	Nyhamna Slug Catcher 2	Ormen Lange gas field	14	160	62.84805	6.94050
PE	Kinteroni Field Slug Catcher				-11.83780	-72.94533
PK	Dhodak Plant Slug Catcher				30.81642	70.48968
PK	Kunnar Slug Catcher 1				25.38369	68.58074
PK	Kunnar Slug Catcher 2				25.38369	68.58074
PK	Qadirpur Slug Catcher				28.05473	69.36721
QA	Slug Catcher 1				25.88965	51.53810
QA	Slug Catcher 2				25.88771	51.54215
QA	Slug Catcher 3				25.88644	51.54472
TM	Slug catcher Dragon Oil	Dragon Oil	6	110	39.40117	53.18819
TM	Slug cather		4	33	38.51432	54.21043
TM	Slug catcher 1 Petronas	Petronas Carigali GTPOGT	8	120	40.16789	52.76912
TM	Slug catcher 2 Petronas	Petronas Carigali GTPOGT	10	230	40.16318	52.77123
TR	Blue Stream Slug Catcher	Blue stream	4	130	41.35985	36.71042
UE	Habshan 5 plant Slug Catcher				23.90766	53.71354
UE	Habshan Slug Catcher 1	GASCO Habsan plant			23.83734	53.65407
UE	Habshan Slug Catcher 2	GASCO Habsan plant			23.83704	53.65426
UA	Zirku Island Slug Catcher				24.87072	53.07181
UK	Bacton Slug Catchers				52.85984	1.46191
UK	Easington Slug Catcher				53.36225	0.23492
UK	Hull Slug Catcher				53.66180	0.10998
US	Canyon Midstream Cryoplant Slug Catcher				36.43756	-99.15882
US	Canyon Redcliff Plant Slug Catcher	Volume 2500 bbl	6	135	36.21184	-99.15533
US	Slug Catcher				31.27392	-103.10827
