= Mist lift =

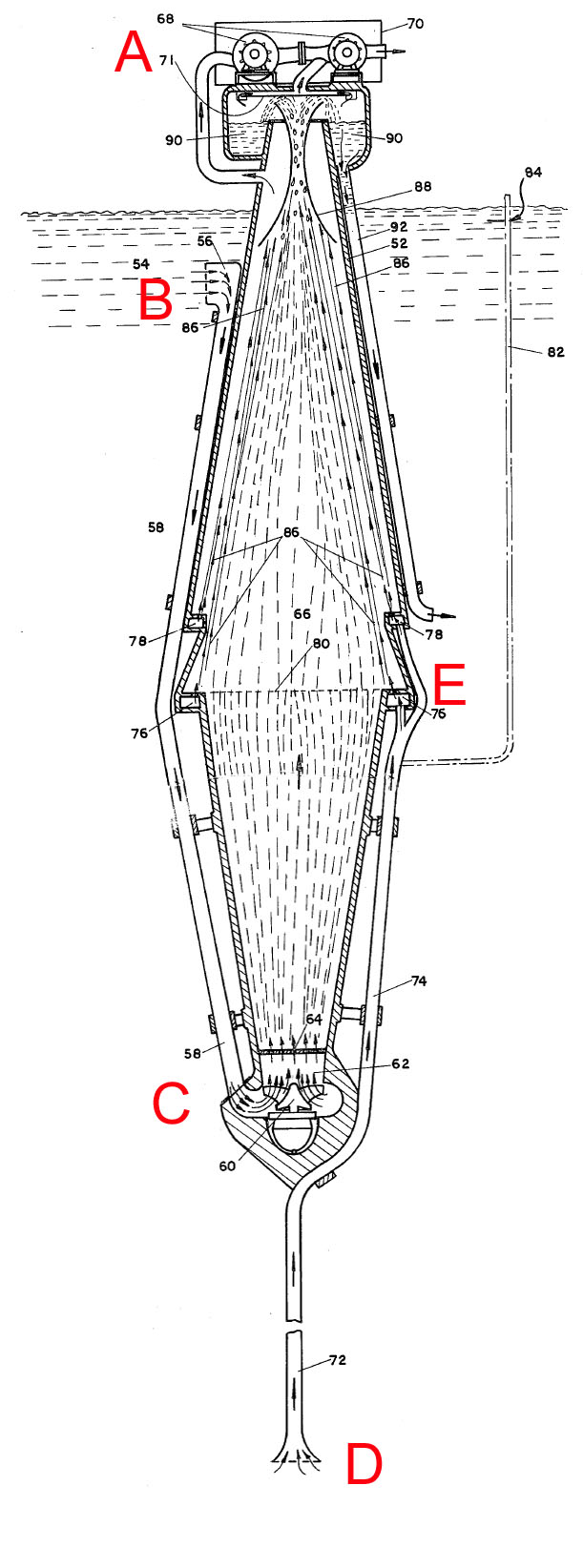
Example Mist flow power generator. A: Vacuum pump which maintains low pressure in the structure. B: Inlet to allow warm water surface water to flow down to the turbine. C: Base of the structure 100M below surface where the turbine is located. D: Cold water pipe which extends to depth (usually 700 to 1000 meters depth). E: Location where cold water jets spray upwards into vessel.

The Mist lift, Mist flow or Steam lift pump is a gas lift technique of lifting water used in a form of Ocean Thermal Energy Conversion (OTEC) where water falls to operate a hydro-electric turbine. The water is pumped from the level it drops to using rising steam which is combined into a multiphase flow. Independent of energy production, the technique can be used simply as a thermally powered pump used to raise ocean water from depths for unspecified uses.

== Operation ==
As in other open cycle OTEC schemes, the technique involves boiling seawater under low atmospheric pressure. The scheme can take many forms so for illustration a particular form will be described and a section below will list details of alternate forms. The prerequisite for mist lift is that a significant thermal gradient exists. Typically warm surface water is expected to be near 25 °C (77 °F). Cold water from depth needs to be in the vicinity of 5 °C (41 °F). A common set of embodiments uses a floating concrete vessel most of which is submerged below the surface. Large volumes of warm surface seawater fall by gravity from a substantial height such as 100 metres (330 ft) to generate electricity from a hydro-electric turbine at the base of the structure. "Mist lift" gets its name by the gas lift technique used to pump the water back out of the structure. Due to the partial vacuum within the structure, warm sea water from the surface boils, creating large volumes of rising steam. 10 metres (33 ft) to 20 metres up, jets of cold sea water are sprayed upwards into the vapor, rapidly contracting it and thereby creating significantly lower pressure at the top of the structure than at the base. This causes the multi-phase steam-water "mist" to be lifted with great velocity to the top of the structure where it exits.

== Details of variations ==
- In land based forms, water is lifted up a tower, and the water falls to drive the turbine.
- Multiphase flow can overcome friction problems of cylinder designs if the jet of cold liquid is sent upwards through the center of cylinder. The contracted vapor is pulled towards the center of the cylinder, reducing contact between higher density portions of the flow and the walls of the cylinder.
- The height of the structure can vary greatly, with larger heights correlated with greater power outputs. The original Ridgway patent called for a structure of 50 metres (160 ft).
- Similar to air lift pumps, the multiphase flow can take the form not only of a mist, but a frothy mix of bubbles as envisioned by Earl Beck
- Bubble laden multiphase flows tend to burst their bubbles as they rise, reducing performance of the pump. This effect can be reduced through use of a foaming agent such as a detergent as proposed by Zener and Fetkovich
- The lift can be separated into two lift stages which theoretically can generate 800 kilowatts per cubic meter per second of cold water.

Details common in Ridgway designs

- A vacuum pump maintains a pressure of 2,400 pascals (0.35 psi) at the base of the structure.
- The cold water jets create a lower pressure of 1,200 pascals (0.17 psi) mid way up the structure.
- Input water is filtered and de-aerated to remove gases in order to improve boiling performance.
- Mist droplets in the range of 200 micrometres can be lifted up to 50 meters by their own vapor generated from flashing.

== Design issues ==
- If the turbine occurs in the process after the water is mist lifted, there can be a large number of micro bubbles which could cause excessive cavitation of the turbine rotor.
- If a submerged structure is used, the cost of the submerged chamber could represent up to 40 percent of the plant cost due to the strength and volume required. A large volume chamber is necessary for high velocity flows to rise without excessive friction. If the structure is high volume and is submerged 100 meters, it must be strong enough to hold back the weight of the ocean at that depth.

== Cost evaluation ==
Mist Lift utilizing thermal temperature differences does not require large pumps and heat exchangers as in other types of OTEC. In closed systems, the expense of the exchangers represents the largest cost of the OTEC plant, with a 100MW plant requiring 200 exchangers the size of 20 foot shipping containers.

In 2010, Makai Ocean Engineering was contracted to construct computer models to evaluate whether a Mist lift power generation plant would be competitive with the dominant OTEC approaches being pursued by researchers. The study estimated that a Mist lift power generation plant could be 17% to 37% cheaper than a closed cycle plant. In submerged mist flow plants, close to 40% of the cost is devoted to creating a strong enough pressure vessel.
