= Deluge (fireboat) =

Deluge (fireboat) may refer to:

- Deluge (fireboat, 1911), a Baltimore fireboat that fought a fire aboard the Kerry Range in 1917
- Deluge (fireboat, 1923), a former fireboat, now a registered National Historic Landmark, in New Orleans
- Deluge (fireboat, 1949), a fireboat that served for forty years in Milwaukee, Wisconsin
