= After the Flood =

After the Flood may refer to:

== Music ==
- After the Flood: Live from the Grand Forks Prom, June 28, 1997, a live album by Soul Asylum released in 2004
- After the Flood, a 2004 album by Clumsy Lovers
- "After the Flood", a song by Talk Talk from the 1991 album Laughing Stock
- "After the Flood", a song by Van der Graaf Generator from the 1970 album The Least We Can Do Is Wave to Each Other

== Other uses ==
- After the Flood (novel) (Swedish: Efter floden), a 1982 novel by the Swedish novelist P. C. Jersild
- After the Flood, a 2012 manga novel in the Warriors series by Erin Hunter
- After the Flood (TV series), a British crime mystery thriller series

== See also ==
- After the Deluge (disambiguation)
- Before the Flood (disambiguation)
