= Porosity =

Ratio of void volume and total volume of a porous material

Porosity or void fraction is a measure of the void (i.e. "empty") spaces in a material, and is a fraction of the volume of voids over the total volume, between 0 and 1, or as a percentage between 0% and 100%. Strictly speaking, some tests measure the "accessible void", the total amount of void space accessible from the surface (cf. closed-cell foam).

There are many ways to test porosity in a substance or part, such as industrial CT scanning.

The term porosity is used in multiple fields including pharmaceutics, ceramics, metallurgy, materials, manufacturing, petrophysics, hydrology, earth sciences, soil mechanics, rock mechanics, and engineering.

== Void fraction in two-phase flow ==
In gas-liquid two-phase flow, the void fraction is defined as the fraction of the flow-channel volume that is occupied by the gas phase or, alternatively, as the fraction of the cross-sectional area of the channel that is occupied by the gas phase.

Void fraction usually varies from location to location in the flow channel (depending on the two-phase flow pattern). It fluctuates with time and its value is usually time averaged. In separated (i.e., non-homogeneous) flow, it is related to volumetric flow rates of the gas and the liquid phase, and to the ratio of the velocity of the two phases (called slip ratio).

== Porosity in earth sciences and construction ==
Used in geology, hydrogeology, soil science, and building science, the porosity of a porous medium (such as rock or sediment) describes the fraction of void space in the material, where the void may contain, for example, air or water. It is defined by the ratio:

$$\phi = \frac{V_\mathrm{V}}{V_\mathrm{T}}$$

where V_{V} is the volume of void-space (such as fluids) and V_{T} is the total or bulk volume of material, including the solid and void components. Both the mathematical symbols $\phi$ and $n$ are used to denote porosity.

Porosity is a fraction between 0 and 1, typically ranging from less than 0.005 for solid granite to more than 0.5 for peat and clay.

The porosity of a rock, or sedimentary layer, is an important consideration when attempting to evaluate the potential volume of water or hydrocarbons it may contain. Sedimentary porosity is a complicated function of many factors, including but not limited to: rate of burial, depth of burial, the nature of the connate fluids, the nature of overlying sediments (which may impede fluid expulsion). One commonly used relationship between porosity and depth is the decreasing exponential function given by the Athy (1930) equation:

$$\phi(z) = \phi_0 e^{-kz}\,$$

where, $\phi(z)$ is the porosity of the sediment at a given depth ($z$) (m), $\phi_0$ is the initial porosity of the sediment at the surface of soil (before its burial), and $k$ is the compaction coefficient (m^{−1}). The letter $e$ with a negative exponent denotes the decreasing exponential function. The porosity of the sediment exponentially decreases with depth, as a function of its compaction.

A value for porosity can alternatively be calculated from the bulk density $\rho_{\text{bulk}}$, saturating fluid density $\rho_{\text{fluid}}$ and particle density $\rho_{\text{particle}}$:

$$\phi = \frac{\rho_{\text{particle}} - \rho_{\text{bulk}}}{\rho_{\text{particle}} - \rho_{\text{fluid}}}$$

If the void space is filled with air, the following simpler form may be used:

$$\phi = 1-\frac{\rho_{\text{bulk}}}{\rho_{\text{particle}}}$$

A mean normal particle density can be taken as approximately 2.65 g/cm^{3} (silica, siliceous sediments or aggregates), or 2.70 g/cm^{3} (calcite, carbonate sediments or aggregates), although a better estimation can be obtained by examining the lithology of the particles.

=== Porosity and hydraulic conductivity ===
Porosity can be proportional to hydraulic conductivity; for two similar sandy aquifers, the one with a higher porosity will typically have a higher hydraulic conductivity (more open area for the flow of water), but there are many complications to this relationship. The principal complication is that there is not a direct proportionality between porosity and hydraulic conductivity but rather an inferred proportionality. There is a clear proportionality between pore throat radii and hydraulic conductivity. Also, there tends to be a proportionality between pore throat radii and pore volume. If the proportionality between pore throat radii and porosity exists then a proportionality between porosity and hydraulic conductivity may exist. However, as grain size or sorting decreases the proportionality between pore throat radii and porosity begins to fail and therefore so does the proportionality between porosity and hydraulic conductivity. For example: clays typically have very low hydraulic conductivity (due to their small pore throat radii) but also have very high porosities (due to the structured nature of clay minerals), which means clays can hold a large volume of water per volume of bulk material, but they do not release water rapidly and therefore have low hydraulic conductivity.

=== Sorting and porosity ===
Effects of sorting on alluvial porosity. Black represents solids, blue represents pore space.

Well sorted (grains of approximately all one size) materials have higher porosity than similarly sized poorly sorted materials (where smaller particles fill the gaps between larger particles). The graphic illustrates how some smaller grains can effectively fill the pores (where all water flow takes place), drastically reducing porosity and hydraulic conductivity, while only being a small fraction of the total volume of the material. For tables of common porosity values for earth materials, see the "further reading" section in the Hydrogeology article.

=== Porosity of rocks ===
Consolidated rocks (e.g., sandstone, shale, granite or limestone) potentially have more complex "dual" porosities, as compared with alluvial sediment. This can be split into connected and unconnected porosity. Connected porosity is more easily measured through the volume of gas or liquid that can flow into the rock, whereas fluids cannot access unconnected pores.

Porosity is the ratio of pore volume to its total volume. Porosity is controlled by: rock type, pore distribution, cementation, diagenetic history and composition. Porosity is not controlled by grain size, as the volume of between-grain space is related only to the method of grain packing.

Rocks normally decrease in porosity with age and depth of burial. Tertiary age Gulf Coast sandstones are in general more porous than Cambrian age sandstones. There are exceptions to this rule, usually because of the depth of burial and thermal history.

=== Porosity of soil ===
Porosity of surface soil typically decreases as particle size increases. This is due to soil aggregate formation in finer textured surface soils when subject to soil biological processes. Aggregation involves particulate adhesion and higher resistance to compaction. Typical bulk density of sandy soil is between 1.5 and 1.7 g/cm^{3}. This calculates to a porosity between 0.43 and 0.36. Typical bulk density of clay soil is between 1.1 and 1.3 g/cm^{3}. This calculates to a porosity between 0.58 and 0.51. This seems counterintuitive because clay soils are termed heavy, implying lower porosity. Heavy apparently refers to a gravitational moisture content effect in combination with terminology that harkens back to the relative force required to pull a tillage implement through the clayey soil at field moisture content as compared to sand.

Porosity of subsurface soil is lower than in surface soil due to compaction by gravity. Porosity of 0.20 is considered normal for unsorted gravel size material at depths below the biomantle. Porosity in finer material below the aggregating influence of pedogenesis can be expected to approximate this value.

Soil porosity is complex. Traditional models regard porosity as continuous. This fails to account for anomalous features and produces only approximate results. Furthermore, it cannot help model the influence of environmental factors which affect pore geometry. A number of more complex models have been proposed, including fractals, bubble theory, cracking theory, Boolean grain process, packed sphere, and numerous other models. The characterisation of pore space in soil is an associated concept.

=== Types of geologic porosities ===
Primary porosity
The main or original porosity system in a rock or unconfined alluvial deposit.
Secondary porosity
A subsequent or separate porosity system in a rock, often enhancing overall porosity of a rock. This can be a result of chemical leaching of minerals or the generation of a fracture system. This can replace the primary porosity or coexist with it (see dual porosity below).
Fracture porosity
This is porosity associated with a fracture system or faulting. This can create secondary porosity in rocks that otherwise would not be reservoirs for hydrocarbons due to their primary porosity being destroyed (for example due to depth of burial) or of a rock type not normally considered a reservoir (for example igneous intrusions or metasediments).
Vuggy porosity
This is secondary porosity generated by dissolution of large features (such as macrofossils) in carbonate rocks leaving large holes, vugs, or even caves.
Effective porosity (also called open porosity)
Refers to the fraction of the total volume in which fluid flow is effectively taking place and includes catenary and dead-end (as these pores cannot be flushed, but they can cause fluid movement by release of pressure like gas expansion) pores and excludes closed pores (or non-connected cavities). This is very important for groundwater and petroleum flow, as well as for solute transport.
Ineffective porosity (also called closed porosity)
Refers to the fraction of the total volume in which fluids or gases are present but in which fluid flow can not effectively take place and includes the closed pores. Understanding the morphology of the porosity is thus very important for groundwater and petroleum flow.
Dual porosity
Refers to the conceptual idea that there are two overlapping reservoirs which interact. In fractured rock aquifers, the rock mass and fractures are often simulated as being two overlapping but distinct bodies. Delayed yield, and leaky aquifer flow solutions are both mathematically similar solutions to that obtained for dual porosity; in all three cases water comes from two mathematically different reservoirs (whether or not they are physically different).:

== IUPAC Classification of Porosity ==
The standardized classification of pore sizes into micro-, meso-, and macroporosity was formally established by the International Union of Pure and Applied Chemistry (IUPAC) in 1985, originating from historical frameworks proposed by M. M. Dubinin and D. H. Everett. This nomenclature was specifically derived from the thermodynamic and kinetic behavior of gas physisorption within rigid solid-state materials. Under this gas-solid interaction framework, boundaries are strictly determined by the mechanisms of gas adsorption:

- Microporosity: Refers to pores with a diameter smaller than 2 nm. In these ultra-fine structures, the adsorption potentials of opposite pore walls overlap, leading to cooperative micropore filling at very low relative pressures. Transport through micropores is often characterized by activated diffusion.
- Mesoporosity: Refers to pores with a diameter between 2 nm and 50 nm. This scale is defined by the occurrence of capillary condensation of the adsorptive gas, which typically manifests as a distinct hysteresis loop during gas adsorption analysis. Transport within mesopores is governed primarily by Knudsen diffusion.
- Macroporosity: Refers to pores with a diameter greater than 50 nm. At this scale, the confinement effect vanishes, and gas molecules behave effectively as they would on an open, unconfined external solid surface. Transport through macropores is described by bulk diffusion.

Although the prefixes "micro", "meso", and "macro" have been widely adopted across a variety of applied disciplines, such as hydrology, pharmaceutical science, and bioengineering, the exact dimensional thresholds defined by IUPAC are frequently disregarded in non-chemical contexts. In applied research, these terms are often utilized colloquially to describe relative structural hierarchies rather than adherence to strict gas-solid sorption dynamics. This semantic divergence introduces significant interdisciplinary ambiguity, particularly in biological and soft-matter fields where functional transport phenomena are governed by cellular and nutrient interactions rather than unconfined molecular gas kinetics.

In applied biological and tissue engineering fields, researchers routinely upscale these exact terms to the micrometer level to better align with cellular dimensions. In biomedical literature, "micropores" are frequently redefined to span up to 10 μm, while "macropores" are loosely defined as anything larger than 10 or 100 μm. This creates a notable semantic paradox when smart materials cross over disciplines, such as a multi-scale hydrogel scaffolds that feature micrometer-scale "macropores" for cell growth while simultaneously carrying nanometer-scale IUPAC "mesoporous" particles, e.g., for localized drug delivery. To mitigate this interdisciplinary confusion and establish a clear biological context for pore characterization, recent alternative frameworks have proposed a cell-relative nomenclature, classifying voids into parvo-, medio-, and magno-pores based on their specific functional interactions with cells and nutrient diffusion.

== Porosity of fabric or aerodynamic porosity ==
The ratio of holes to solid that the wind "sees". Aerodynamic porosity is less than visual porosity, by an amount that depends on the constriction of holes.

== Die casting porosity ==
Casting porosity is a consequence of one or more of the following: gasification of contaminants at molten-metal temperatures; shrinkage that takes place as molten metal solidifies; and unexpected or uncontrolled changes in temperature or humidity.

While porosity is inherent in die casting manufacturing, its presence may lead to component failure where pressure integrity is a critical characteristic. Porosity may take on several forms from interconnected micro-porosity, folds, and inclusions to macro porosity visible on the part surface. The result of porosity is the creation of a leak path through the walls of a casting that prevents the part from holding pressure. Porosity may also lead to out-gassing during the painting process, leaching of plating acids and tool chatter in machining pressed metal components.

== Measuring porosity ==
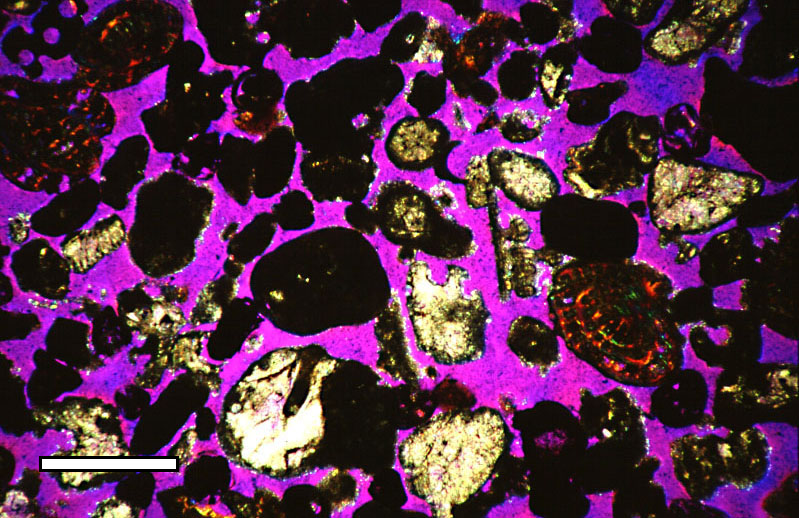
Optical method of measuring porosity: thin section under gypsum plate shows porosity as purple color, contrasted with carbonate grains of other colors. Pleistocene eolianite from San Salvador Island, Bahamas. Scale bar 500 μm.

Several methods can be employed to measure porosity:

- Direct methods (determining the bulk volume of the porous sample, and then determining the volume of the skeletal material with no pores (pore volume = total volume − material volume).
- Optical methods (e.g., determining the area of the material versus the area of the pores visible under the microscope). The "areal" and "volumetric" porosities are equal for porous media with random structure.
- Computed tomography method (using industrial CT scanning to create a 3D rendering of external and internal geometry, including voids. Then implementing a defect analysis utilizing computer software)
- Imbibition methods, i.e., immersion of the porous sample, under vacuum, in a fluid that preferentially wets the pores.
  - Water saturation method (pore volume = total volume of water − volume of water left after soaking).
- Water evaporation method (pore volume = (weight of saturated sample − weight of dried sample)/density of water)
- Mercury intrusion porosimetry (several non-mercury intrusion techniques have been developed due to toxicological concerns, and the fact that mercury tends to form amalgams with several metals and alloys).
- Gas expansion method. A sample of known bulk volume is enclosed in a container of known volume. It is connected to another container with a known volume which is evacuated (i.e., near vacuum pressure). When a valve connecting the two containers is opened, gas passes from the first container to the second until a uniform pressure distribution is attained. Using ideal gas law, the volume of the pores is calculated as

$$V_V = V_T-V_a-V_b {P_2 \over {P_2-P_1}}$$,

where

V_{V} is the effective volume of the pores,
V_{T} is the bulk volume of the sample,
V_{a} is the volume of the container containing the sample,
V_{b} is the volume of the evacuated container,
P_{1} is the initial pressure in the initial pressure in volume V_{a} and V_{V}, and
P_{2} is final pressure present in the entire system.
The porosity follows straightforwardly by its proper definition
$$\phi = \frac{V_V}{V_T}$$.
Note that this method assumes that gas communicates between the pores and the surrounding volume. In practice, this means that the pores must not be closed cavities.

- Thermoporosimetry and cryoporometry. A small crystal of a liquid melts at a lower temperature than the bulk liquid, as given by the Gibbs-Thomson equation. Thus if a liquid is imbibed into a porous material, and frozen, the melting temperature will provide information on the pore-size distribution. The detection of the melting can be done by sensing the transient heat flows during phase-changes using differential scanning calorimetry – (DSC thermoporometry), measuring the quantity of mobile liquid using nuclear magnetic resonance – (NMR cryoporometry) or measuring the amplitude of neutron scattering from the imbibed crystalline or liquid phases – (ND cryoporometry).

== See also ==
- Archie's law
- Bulk density
- Coherent diffraction imaging
- Packing density
- Particle density (packed density)
- Petroleum geology
- Poromechanics
- Void (composites)
- Void ratio
