= Fludd =

Fludd may refer to:

== People ==
- Robert Fludd, 16th century mystic
- Thomas Fludd, MP

== Other ==
- Fludd (band), a Canadian rock band prominent in the 1970s
- Fludd (novel), a novel by Hilary Mantel
- F.L.U.D.D. (Flash Liquidizer Ultra Dousing Device), a water jet used as Mario's main weapon in Super Mario Sunshine

== See also ==
- Flood (disambiguation)
