= Hulda (given name) =

- Gender: Female

Origin
- Origin: Hebrew, Old Norse, Old Swedish, Icelandic
- Meaning: weasel or mole (Hebrew), secrecy (Old Norse), sweet or lovable (Old Swedish), the fairy or hidden one (Icelandic)

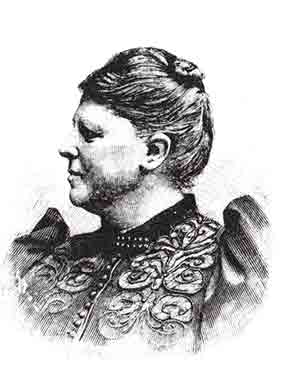
Hulda Lundin (1847-1921), pictured in 1880

Hulda (Hebrew: חוּלְדָה) is a feminine given name derived from חולדה Chuldah or Huldah, a Hebrew word meaning weasel or mole. Huldah was a prophetess in the Old Testament Books of Kings and Chronicles. It can also derive from Norse mythology, where it is the name of a sorceress, meaning secrecy in Old Norse and sweet or lovable in Old Swedish. In the United States, its use has declined since the mid-1920s.

== Variants ==
- Huldah
- Chuldah

== Notable people ==
Notable people with this name include:

- Hulda Berger (1912–1951), American figure skater
- Hulda Crooks (1896–1997), American mountaineer
- Hulda Flood (1886–1968), Swedish politician
- Hulda Garborg (1862–1934), Norwegian writer
- Hulda Regina Graser (1870-1943), Canadian-born American customs house broker
- Hulda Guzmán (born 1984), Dominican figurative painter
- Hulda Lundin (1847–1921), Swedish tailor and educator
- Hulda Mellgren (1839–1918) Swedish industrialist
- Hulda Regehr Clark (1928–2009), American naturopath
- Hulda Shipanga (1926–2010), Namibian nurse
- Hulda Stumpf (1867–1930), Kenyan Christian missionary
