= Slug flow =

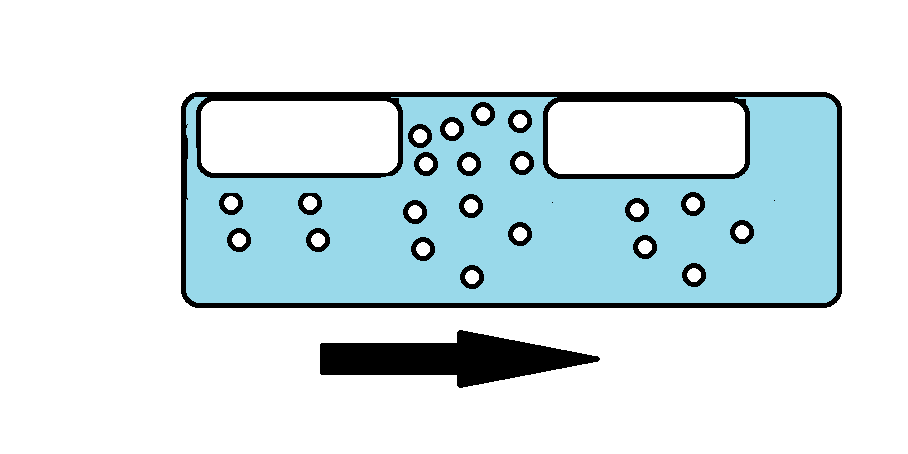
An image depicting slug flow, where gas bubbles in a liquid 'slug' push along a larger gas bubble.

In fluid mechanics, slug flow in liquid–gas two-phase flow is a type of flow pattern. Lighter, faster moving continuous fluid which contains gas bubbles - pushes along a disperse gas bubble. Pressure oscillations within piping can be caused by slug flow. The word slug usually refers to the heavier, slower moving fluid, but can also be used to refer to the bubbles of the lighter fluid.

This flow is characterised by the intermittent sequence of liquid slugs followed by longer gas bubbles flowing through a pipe. The flow regime is similar to plug flow, but the bubbles are larger and move at a greater velocity.

== Examples ==
- Production of hydrocarbon in wells and their transportation in pipelines;.
- Production of steam and water in geothermal power plants.
- Boiling and condensation in liquid-vapor systems of thermal power plants;
- Emergency core cooling of nuclear reactors.
- Heat and mass transfer between gas and liquid in chemical reactors.

== See also ==
- Slip ratio (gas–liquid flow)
- Slugcatcher
- Plug flow
- Two-phase flow
- Multiphase flow
