= Before the Flood =

Before the Flood may refer to:

- Antediluvian, the period in Christian and Jewish theology also known as "Pre-Flood"
- Before the Flood (album), an album by Bob Dylan and The Band
- "Before the Flood" (Doctor Who), an episode of Doctor Who
- Before the Flood (film), a 2016 documentary film on climate change, co-produced by and starring Leonardo DiCaprio
  - Before the Flood (soundtrack), a soundtrack album from the film

== See also ==
- After the Flood (disambiguation)
