= Multiphase flow =

Simultaneous flow of materials with two or more thermodynamic phases

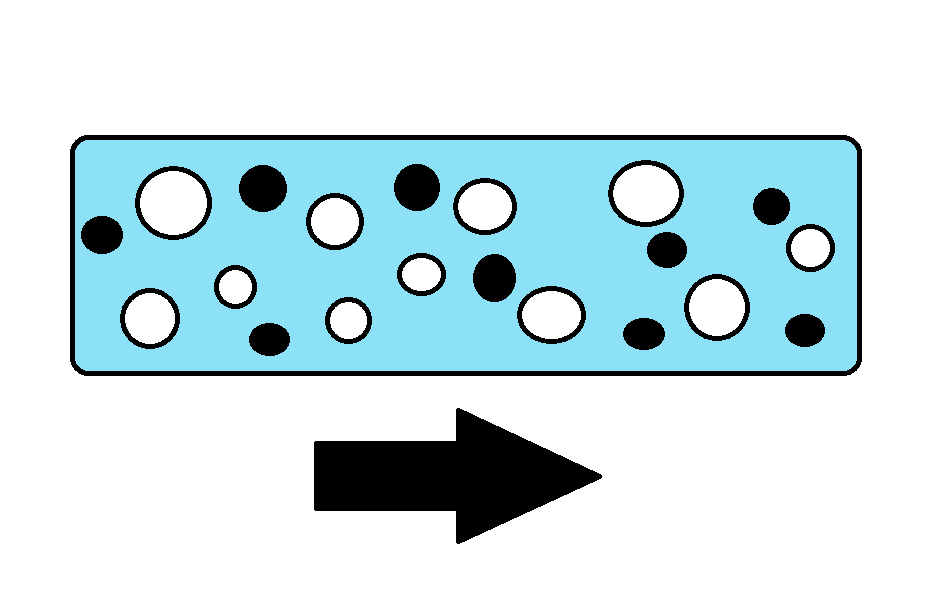
Sketch of multiphase flow in an oil pipe, where the continuous phase is the liquid (blue) carrying smaller particles. Gas (white) and oil particles (black) are in a disperse phase.

In fluid mechanics, multiphase flow is the simultaneous flow of materials with two or more thermodynamic phases. Virtually all processing technologies from cavitating pumps and turbines to paper-making and the construction of plastics involve some form of multiphase flow. It is also prevalent in many natural phenomena.

These phases may consist of one chemical component (e.g. flow of water and water vapor), or several different chemical components (e.g. flow of oil and water). A phase is classified as continuous if it occupies a continually connected region of space (as opposed to disperse if the phase occupies disconnected regions of space). The continuous phase may be either gaseous or a liquid. The disperse phase can consist of a solid, liquid or gas.

Two general topologies can be identified: disperse flows and separated flows. The former consists of finite particles, drops or bubbles distributed within a continuous phase, whereas the latter consists of two or more continuous streams of fluids separated by interfaces.

== History ==
The study of multiphase flow is strongly linked to the development of fluid mechanics and thermodynamics. A key early discovery was made by Archimedes of Syracuse (250 BCE) who postulated the laws of buoyancy, which became known as the Archimedes' principle – which is used in modelling multiphase flow.

In the mid-20th century, advances in nucleate boiling were developed and the first two-phase pressure-drop models were formed, primarily for the chemical and process industries. In particular, Lockhart and Martinelli (1949) presented a model for frictional pressure drop in horizontal, separated two-phase flow, introducing a parameter that is still utilised today. Between 1950 and 1960, intensive work in the aerospace and nuclear sectors triggered further studies into two-phase flow. In 1958 one of the earliest systematic studies of two-phase flow was undertaken by Soviet scientist Teletov. Baker (1965) conducted studies into vertical flow regimes.

From the 1970s onwards, multiphase flow especially in the context of the oil industry has been studied extensively due to the increasing dependence of petroleum by the world economy.

The 1980s saw further modelling of multiphase flow by modelling flow patterns to different pipe inclinations and diameters and different pressures and flows. Advancements in computing power in the 1990s allowed for increasingly complex modelling techniques to modelling multiphase flow, flows that were previously limited to one-dimensional problems could be pushed to three-dimensional models.

Projects to develop multiphase flow metering technology (MFM), used to measure the rate of individual phase flow appeared in the 1990s. The impetus behind this technology was a forecasted decline of production from the major North Sea oil fields. Oil companies that created early prototypes included BP and Texaco, MFMS have now become ubiquitous and are now the primary metering solution for new-field developments.

== Examples and applications ==
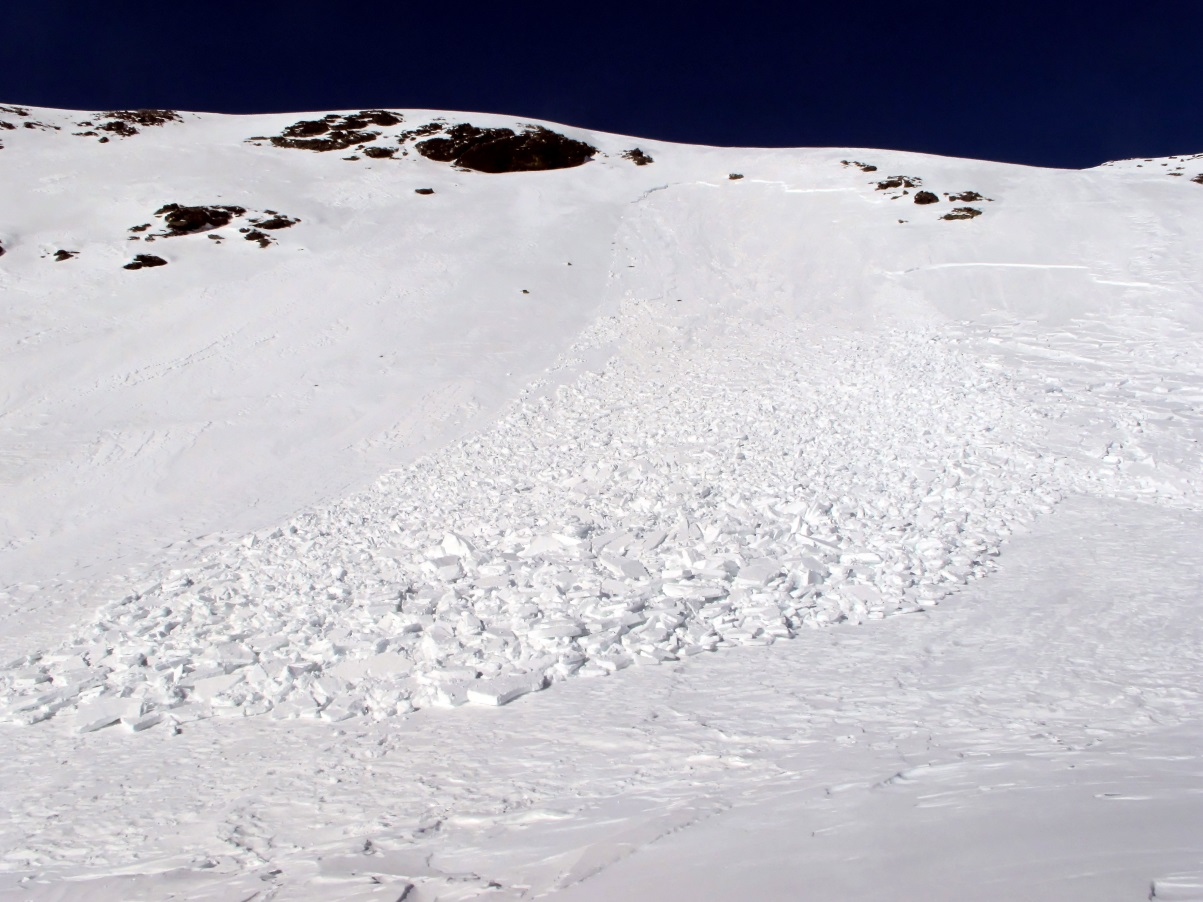
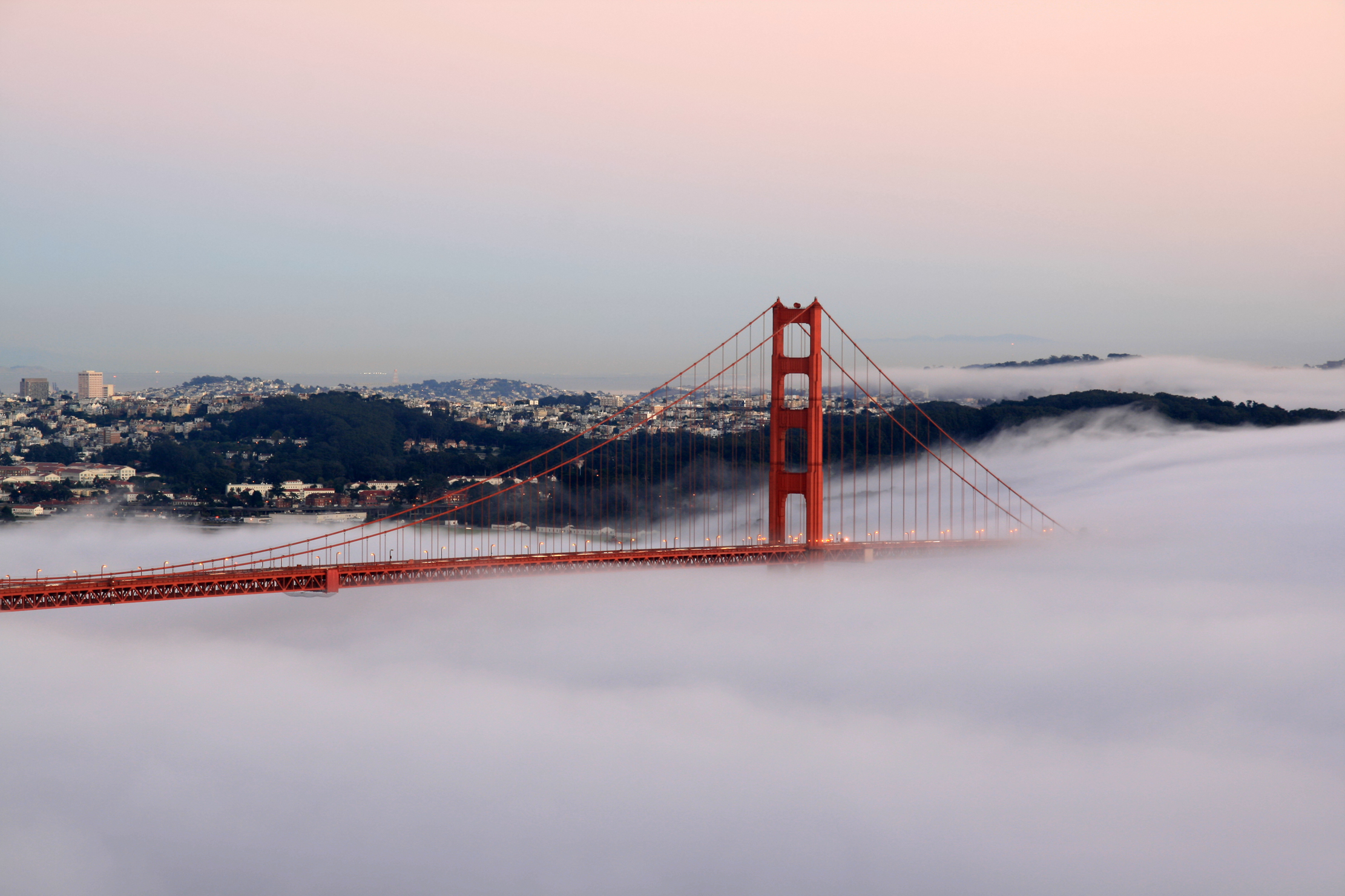
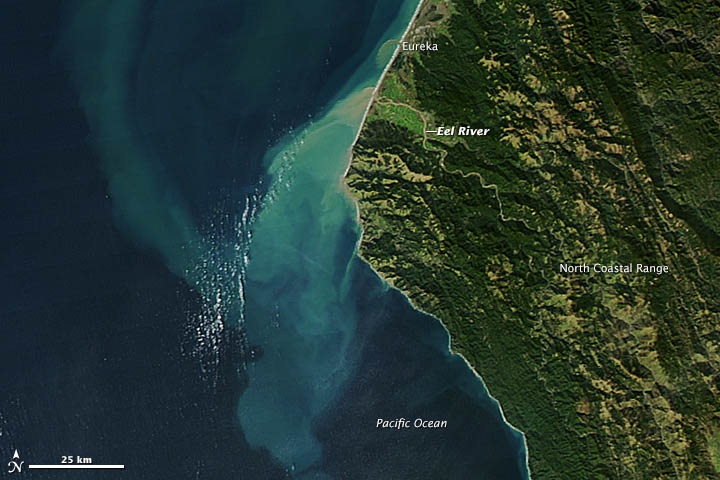
Multiphase flow in nature. Avalanche on the Alps, fog engulfing the Golden Gate Bridge and sediment being deposited into the Pacific Ocean by the Eel river.

Multiphase flow occurs regularly in many natural phenomena, and also is well documented and crucial within various industries.

=== In nature ===
Sediment transport in rivers is subject to multiphase flow, in which the suspended particles are treated as a disperse second phase which interacts with the continuous fluid phase.

An example of multiphase flow on a smaller scale would be within porous structures. Pore-structure modelling enables the use of Darcy's law to calculate the volumetric flow rate through porous media such as groundwater flow through rock. Further examples occur within the bodies of living organisms, such as blood flow (with plasma being the liquid phase and red blood cells constituting the solid phase. Also flow within the intestinal tract of the human body, with solid food particles and water flowing simultaneously.

=== In industry ===
The large majority of processing technology involves multiphase flow. A common example of multiphase flow in industry is a fluidized bed. This device combines a solid-liquid mixture and causes it to move like a fluid. Further examples include water electrolysis, bubbly flow in nuclear reactors, gas-particle flow in combustion reactors and fiber suspension flows within the pulp and paper industry.

In oil and gas industries, multiphase flow often implies to simultaneous flow of oil, water and gas. The term is also applicable to the properties of a flow in some field where there is a chemical injection or various types of inhibitors. In petroleum engineering, drilling fluid consists of a gas-solid phase. Furthermore, crude oil during flow through pipelines is a gas-oil-water three phase flow.

== Types ==
The most common class of multiphase flows are two-phase flows, and these include Gas-Liquid Flow, Gas-Solid Flow, Liquid-Liquid Flow and Liquid-Solid Flow. These flows are the most studied, and are of most interest in the context of industry. Different patterns of multiphase flow are known as flow regimes.

=== Two-phase liquid-gas pipeline flow ===
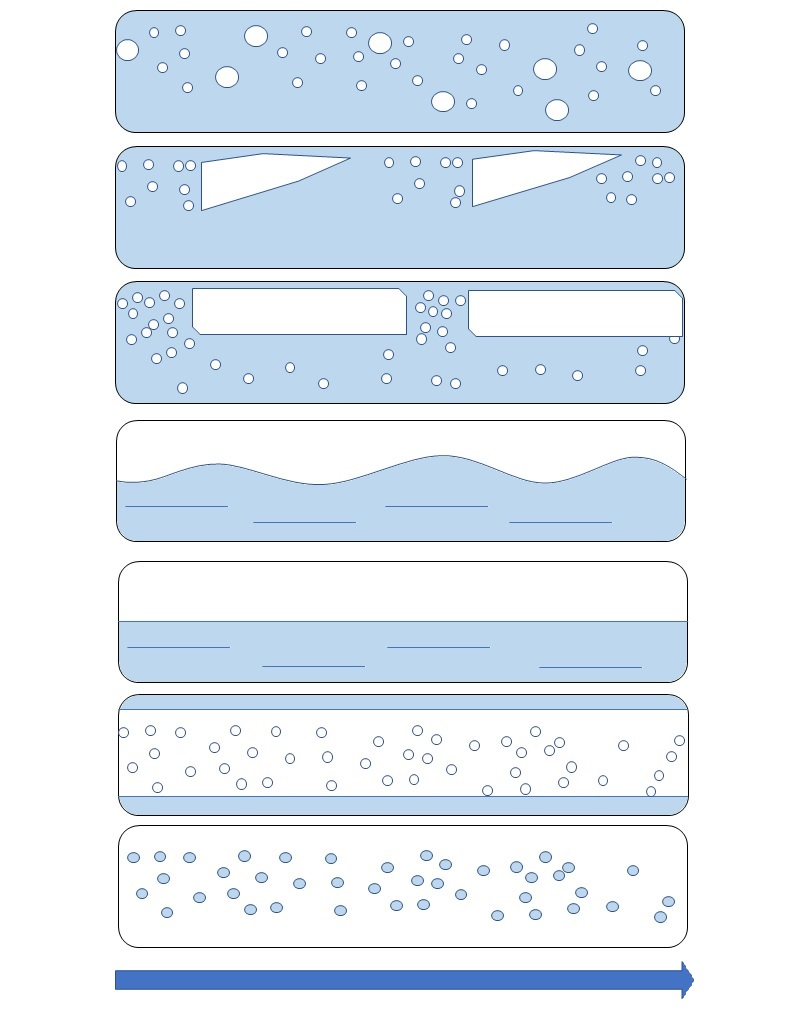
Flow regimes in horizontal flow from top to bottom: Bubble flow, Plug flow, Slug flow, Wavy flow, Stratified flow, Annular flow and Mist flow

Flow patterns in pipes are governed by the diameter of the pipe, the physical properties of the fluids and their flow rates. As velocity and gas-liquid ratio is increased, "bubble flow" transitions into "mist flow". At high liquid-gas ratios, liquid forms the continuous phase and at low values it forms the disperse phase. In plug and slug flow, gas flows faster than the liquid and the liquid forms a 'slug' which becomes detached and velocity decreases until the next liquid slug catches up.

Flow regimes in horizontal two-phase flow
Regime	Description
Bubble/Dispersed bubble flow	Occurs at large liquid flow rates with little gas flow. Bubbles of gas dispersed or suspended throughout the liquid continuous phase. Typical features of this flow are moving and deformed interfaces of bubbles in time and space domains and complex interactions between the interfaces. This flow can be categorised further into Ideally Separated, Interacting Bubble, Churn Turbulent and Clustered. Due to the buoyancy force, bubbles tend to drift in the upper portion of the pipe.
Plug flow	Develops as the flow rate is increased whilst vapor flow is maintained at a low amount. Plugs of gas in liquid phase where the velocity is assumed to be constant whilst 'plugs', essentially 'bullet shaped' bubbles of gas that cover the cross section of the pipe flow intermittently through the pipe in the upper portion of the pipe due to buoyancy forces.
Stratified flow	Gas and liquid flow where there is separation by an interface. This occurs when the gravity force dominates which causes stratification of the liquid at the bottom of the pipe. Most common in horizontal or slightly inclined pipelines. At low velocities, smooth interfaces occur whereas at greater velocities waves appear.
Wavy flow	Characterised by a gas-liquid flows in parallel streams, the interface between them is flat at low gas velocities, waves appear due to perturbations when velocity is increased. An example would be waves on the sea.
Slug flow	Defined by the intermittent sequence of liquid 'slugs' containing disperse gas bubbles alternating with longer bubbles with greater width. Unsteady flow regime even when velocities are kept constant.
Annular flow	Occurs when a liquid film in gas-liquid flow covers the channel wall in an annulus shape with gas flowing in the core. The core can also contain liquid droplets, this case is known as annular-dispersed flow.
Mist/Dispersed mist flow	Occurs at very high gas flow rates. Characterised by a disperse phase being suspended in a continuous phase. In the case of gas-liquid flow, it occurs when liquid particles are suspended in a continuous gas phase.

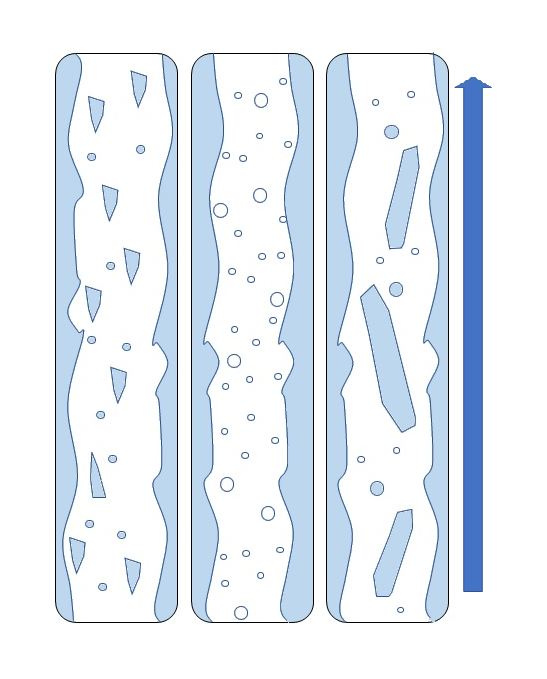
Common vertical flow regimes - From left to right: Churn flow, Annular flow and Wispy annular flow

In Vertical flow axial symmetry exists and flow patterns are more stable. However, in regards to slug flow oscillations in this regime can occur. Horizontal flow regimes can be applied here, however, we see a more even distribution of particles due to the buoyancy force acting in the direction of the pipe.

Churn flow occurs when slug flow breaks down, leading to an unstable regime in which there is an oscillatory motion of the liquid.

Wispy annular flow is characterised by the liquid 'wisps' that exist in the annular flow regime. Presumably due to the coalescence of the large concentration of contained droplets in the liquid film covering the pipe. This regime occurs at high mass fluxes.

=== Liquid-solid flow ===
Hydraulic transport consists of flows in which solid particles are dispersed in a continuous liquid phase. They are often referred to as slurry flows. Applications include the transport of coals and ores to the flow of mud.

Suspensions are classified into the following groups; fine suspensions in which the particles are uniformly distributed within the liquid and coarse suspensions where particles ted to travel predominantly in the bottom half of a horizontal pipe at a lower velocity than the liquid and a significantly lower velocity than the liquid in a vertical pipe.

=== Gas-solid pipeline flow ===
Gas–solid two-phase flow widely exists in chemical engineering, power engineering, and metallurgical engineering. In order to reduce atmospheric pollution and pipe erosion, improve product quality, and process efficiency, flow parameter measurement of two-phase flow by pneumatic conveying (using pressurised gas to induce flow) is becoming increasingly widespread.

Flow regimes in Gas-solid flow
Regime	Description
Uniform Suspended flow	Particles are evenly distributed over the cross-section over the whole length of the pipe.
Non-Uniform suspended flow	The flow is similar to the above description, but a tendency for particles to flow preferentially in the lower portion of the pipe, this occurs especially with larger particles.
Slug flow	As the particles enter the conveying line, they tend to settle out before they are fully accelerated. They form dunes which are then swept downstream creating an uneven longitudinal distribution of particles along the pipeline.
Dune flow	As the particles settle into dunes as stated above, the dunes remain stationary with particles being conveyed above the dunes and being swept from one dune to the next.
Moving bed	Particles settle near the feed point and form a continuous bed at the bottom of the pipe. The bed develops gradually throughout the length of the pipe and moves slowly forward. There is a velocity gradient in the vertical direction in the bed and conveying continues in suspended form above the bed.
Stationary bed	Similar to a moving bed, however, there is little to no movement of particles on the bed. The bed builds up until the pipe is blocked if velocity is low enough.
Plug flow	Following slug flow, the particles instead of forming stationary dunes gradually build up over the cross-section until they cause a blockage; this is less common than dune flow however.

=== Three-phase and above ===
Three-phase flows are also of practical significance, and examples are as follows:

1. Gas-liquid-solid flows: This type of system occurs in two-phase fluidised bed and gas lift chemical reactors where a gas-liquid reaction is promoted by solid catalyst particles suspended in the mixture. Another example is froth flotation as a method to separate minerals and carry out gas-liquid reactions in the presence of a catalyst.
2. Three-phase, gas-liquid-liquid flows: Mixtures of vapors and two immiscible liquid phases are common in chemical engineering plants. Examples are gas-oil-water flows in oil recovery systems and immiscible condensate-vapor flows in steam/hydrocarbon condensing systems. Further examples lie in the flow of oil, water and natural gas. These flows can occur in condensation or evaporation of liquid mixtures (e.g. the condensation or evaporation of steam or hydrocarbons).
3. Solid-liquid-liquid flows: An example is sand mixing with oil and water in a pipeline.

Multiphase flows are not restricted to only three phases. An example of a four phase flow system would be that of direct-contact freeze crystallization in which, for example, butane liquid is injected into solution from which the crystals are to be formed, and freezing occurs as a result of the evaporation of the liquid butane. In this case, the four phases are, respectively, butane liquid, butane vapor, solute phase and crystalline (solid) phase.

== Characteristics ==
=== Modelling ===
Due to the presence of multiple phases, there are considerable complications in describing and quantifying the nature of the flow compared with conditions of single phase flow. Velocity distribution is difficult to calculate due to the lack of knowledge of the velocities of each phase at a single point.

There are several ways to model multiphase flow, including the Euler-Langrange method, where the fluid phase is treated as a continuum by solving the Navier-Stokes equations. The dispersed phase is solved by tracking a large number of disperse particles, bubbles or droplets. The dispersed phase can exchange momentum, mass and energy with the fluid phase.

Euler-Euler two phase flow is characterised by the volume-averaged mass conservation equation for each phase. In this model, the disperse and continuous phase are treated as fluids. The concept of a volume fraction is introduced for each phase, discussed in the parameter section below.

The most simple method to categorize continuous multiphase flows is to consider treat each phase independently. This concept is known as the homogeneous flow model first proposed by Soviet scientists in the 1960s. Assumptions in this model are:

- The gas phase velocity is equal to the liquid phase velocity
- Two-phase medium is in thermodynamic equilibrium

=== Parameters ===
For multiphase flow in pipes, the mass flow rate for each phase can be determined using the equation:

$G = \dot{m} = \lim\limits_{\Delta t \rightarrow 0}\frac{\Delta m}{ \Delta t}= \frac{{\rm d}m}{{\rm d}t}$

Where $\ G$ = mass flow rate of a single phase, Δ = change in quantity, m = Mass of that phase t = time and the dot above m being a time derivative.

The volumetric flow rate can be described using the below equation:

$Q = \dot V = \lim\limits_{\Delta t \rightarrow 0}\frac{\Delta V}{\Delta t}= \frac{\mathrm d V}{\mathrm d t}$

Where Q = volumetric flow rate of a single phase, V = Volume.

The variables stated above can be input into the below parameters that are important in the description of multiphase flow. In wellbore multiphase flow the mass flow rate, volumetric fraction and velocity of each phase are important parameters.

Key parameters that describe multiphase flow in a conduit.
Parameter	Equation	Description
Mass flow rate	$G = G_g+G_l+G_s$	Mass flow rate being the mass of fluid which passes through the cross-section per unit of time. Where G = mass flow rate, g = gas, l = liquid and s = solid.
Volumetric flow rate	$Q = Q_g+Q_l+Q_s$	The Volumetric flow rate, defined as the volume of fluid passing through a cross sectional area per unit of time:
Mass fraction	$x_i = \lim\limits_{\delta V \rightarrow V^o}\frac{\Delta G_i}{\Delta G} = \frac{G_i}{G_g+G_l+G_s}$	Where G_{i} is the mass flow rate of either the liquid, solid or gas phase. Defined as the ratio of the mass of one phase to the total mass of the mixture passing through the cross-section per unit of time.
Volume fraction	$\beta_i =\lim\limits_{\delta V \rightarrow V^o}\frac{\Delta Q_i}{\Delta Q} =\frac{Q_i}{Q_g+Q_l+Q_s}$	Where Q_{i} is the volumetric flow rate of either the liquid, solid or gas phase. Q is the total volumetric flow rate. The volume fraction is defined as the ratio of the volume of one phase divided by the total volume of the mixture passing through the cross-section per unit of time.
Superficial velocity	$s_g = \frac{Q_g}{A}, s_l = \frac{Q_l}{A}, s_s = \frac{Q_s}{A}$	Where $s_g =$ superficial velocity of gas phase (m/s), $s_l =$velocity of liquid phase and $s_s =$velocity of solid phase. Superficial velocity is a hypothetical velocity wherein the assumption is that one phase occupies the entire cross sectional area.
Actual velocity	$v_g = \frac{Q_g}{A_g}, v_l = \frac{Q_l}{A_l}, v_s = \frac{Q_s}{A_s}$	Where $v_g =$ actual velocity of gas phase (m/s), $v_l =$velocity of liquid phase and $v_s =$velocity of solid phase.

A flow through a conduit of constant cross-sectional area is considered to be under steady-state conditions when its velocity and pressure may vary from point to point but do not change with time. If these conditions are variable with time then the flow is known as transient. The gas phase most commonly flows at a higher velocity than the liquid phase, this is due to the lower density and viscosity.

=== Fundamental forces in multi-phase flow ===
The volumetric flow rate and fluid motion, in general, is driven by different forces acting on fluid elements. There are five forces that affect flow rate, each of these forces can be categorised in three different types; line, surface and volume.

Consider a line element of length L. Volume forces act on an element proportional to the volume ($V \propto L^3$). Surface forces act on elements proportional to the size of the area ($A \propto L^2$) and line forces act on one dimensional curve elements ($\zeta \propto L$):

Classifying the forces involved in multiphase flow
Force	Type	Magnitude of force	Magnitude of force per unit volume
Pressure	Surface	$F_p\propto \Alpha\Delta P$	$f_P\propto\Delta P L^{-1}$
Inertia	Volume	$F_I\propto V\Delta\rho U^2L^{-1}$	$f_I\propto\rho U^2L^{-1}$
Viscous	Surface	$F_V\propto \Alpha\mu UL^{-1}$	$f_V\propto\mu UL^{-2}$
Buoyancy	Volume	$F_B\propto \ V g \Delta\rho$	$f_B\propto g \Delta\rho$
Surface	Line	$F_S\propto \ L\sigma$	$f_S\propto \sigma L^{-2}$

Where P = pressure, ρ = mass density, Δ = change in quantity, σ = surface tension, μ = Dynamic viscosity, A = area g = acceleration due to gravity, L = linear dimension, V = volume, U = velocity of continuous phase.

The pressure force acts on an area or surface elements and accelerates the fluid in the downwards direction of the pressure gradient. The pressure difference between the beginning and the end of the pressure gradient is known as the pressure drop. The Darcy-Weisbach equation can be utilised to calculate pressure drop in a channel.

The viscous force acts on a surface or area element and tends to make the flow uniform by diminishing velocity differences between phases, effectively opposes flow and lessens flow rate. This is evident in comparisons between high viscosity oil mixtures in comparison with low viscosity mixtures, where the higher viscosity oil moves slower.

The inertia force is a volume force, which retains the direction and the magnitude of the motion. It is equivalent to the magnitude of the mass of the element multiplied by its acceleration. Acceleration is defined in this case as $U^2L^{-1}$, due to the linear dimension L being proportional to time. Higher inertia forces lead to turbulence, whereas lower inertia results in laminar flow.

The buoyancy force represents the net action of gravity whilst the density is non-uniform. The surface-tension force acts on a line or curve element and minimizes the surface area of the interface - this force is specific to gas-liquid or liquid-liquid flows.

==== Key dimensionless relations ====
A vortex street around a cylinder which can occur in multiphase flow. This occurs around a Reynolds number between 40 and 1000 independent of cylinder size, fluid speed and fluid.

From the forces shown in the table above, five independent dimensionless quantities can be derived, these relations provide insight into how the multiphase flow will behave:

The Reynolds number. This number predicts whether flow in each phase is either turbulent or laminar.

$\mathrm{Re} = \frac{F_I}{F_V} = \frac{f_I}{f_V}=\frac{\rho\ LU}{\mu}$

At low Reynolds numbers, flow tends towards laminar flow, whereas at high numbers turbulence results from differences in fluid speed.

In general, laminar flow occurs when Re < 2300 and turbulent flow occurs when Re >4000. In the interval, both laminar and turbulent flows are possible and these are called transition flows. This number is dependent on geometry of the flow.

For a mixture of oil and water flowing at high velocity it is most common to form a dispersed bubble type flow. Turbulent flow consists of eddies of different size range. Eddies that have larger size than droplets, transport these droplets through the flow field. Eddies, which are smaller or equal to the size of the droplets, cause droplet deformation and break-up. It can be viewed as eddies collide with droplets and break them if they have sufficient energy to overcome the droplets internal forces.

At the same time, turbulent flow induces droplet-droplet interaction, which is important for the coalescence mechanism. When two droplets collide, this may lead to coalescence, resulting in a bigger droplet size.

The Euler number describes the relationship between the pressure and inertial forces.

$\mathrm{Eu} = \frac{F_P}{F_I} = \frac{f_P}{f_I}=\frac{\Delta\ p}{\ \rho U^2}$

It is used to characterise energy losses in the flow. A completely friction-less flow is represented by an Euler number of 1. This number is important when the pressure force is dominant. Examples include, flow through pipes, flow over submerged bodies and flow of water through orifices.

The Froude number is the ratio of inertia against gravity.

$\mathrm{Fr} = \frac{F_I}{F_G} = \frac{f_I}{f_G}=\frac{U^2}{gL}$

When Fr < 1, small surface waves move upstream, Fr > 1 they will be carried downstream and when Fr = 0 the velocity is equal to the surface waves. This number is relevant when gravitational force is predominant in the fluid motion. For example, open channel flow, wave motion in the ocean, forces on bridge piers and offshore structures.

The Eötvös number defines the ratio of buoyancy compared with surface tension forces.

$\mathrm{Eo} = \frac{F_B}{F_S} = \frac{f_B}{f_S}= \frac{\Delta\rho gL^2}{\sigma}$

A high value for this number indicates that the system is relatively unaffected by surface tension effects. A low value indicates that surface tension dominates.

The Weber number determines the relationship between the inertial force and surface tension.

$\mathrm{We} = \frac{F_I}{F_S} = \frac{f_I}{f_S}= \frac{\rho LU^2}{\sigma}$

It also determines the droplet size of the disperse phase. This number is used extensively in flow regime maps. The influence of pipe diameter is well understood through the Weber number.

Three different regimes in assuming that gravity is negligible, or within microgravity can be identified:

1. Surface tension dominated regime with bubble and slug flow. (We<1)
2. An inertia dominated regime with annular flow. (We>20)
3. Transitional regime with a frothy slug-annular flow.

The transition from frothy slug-annular flow to fully developed annular flow occurs at We = 20.

The Capillary number can be defined using the Weber number and the Reynolds number. It is the relative importance of viscous forces relative to surface forces.

$\mathrm{Ca} = \frac{F_V}{F_S} = \frac{f_V}{f_S}=\frac{\mu U}{\sigma}=\frac{We}{Re}$

In microchannel flows, the capillary number plays a critical role as both surface tension and viscous forces are important.

In enhanced oil recovery operations, capillary number is an important number to consider. Whilst capillary number is higher, viscous forces dominate and the effect of interface tension between fluids in rock pores are reduced thereby augmenting recovery. In typical reservoir conditions, capillary number varies from 10^{−8} to 10^{−2}.

== See also ==
- Buckley–Leverett equation
- Darcy's law for multiphase flow in porous media as developed (or generalized) by Morris Muskat et alios
- Darcy's law for single phase flow is the fundamental law for fluid flow in porous media
- Hagen–Poiseuille equation
- Multiphase flow meter
- Multiphase heat transfer
- Process tomography
- Two-phase flow
