= Ledinegg instability =

In fluid dynamics, the Ledinegg instability occurs in two-phase flow, especially in a boiler tube, when the boiling boundary is within the tube. For a given mass flux J through the tube, the pressure drop per unit length (which typically varies as the square of the mass flux and inversely as the density, i.e., as $J^2/\rho$) is much less when the flow is wholly of liquid than when the flow is wholly of steam. Thus, as the boiling boundary moves up the tube, the total pressure drop falls, potentially increasing the flow in an unstable manner. Boiler tubes normally overcome this (which is effectively a 'negative resistance' regime) by incorporating a narrow orifice at the entry, to give a stabilising pressure drop on entry.
