= Culturcide =

American punk band

- Tacky Souvenirs of Pre-Revolutionary America, 1986

Background information
- Origin: Houston, Texas, United States
- Genres: Punk rock, post-punk, art punk, industrial, experimental rock, plunderphonics
- Years active: 1980–1990, 1993–present (hiatus 1990-1993)
- Members: Perry Webb; Dan Workman (1980-present); Ralf Armin (1982-present)
- Past members: Jim Craine (1980-82); Bill Loner (1981-82)

Culturcide was an American, Houston-based experimental punk band, active from 1980 to 1990 and from 1993 to the present day. They were notorious for their 1986 album Tacky Souvenirs of Pre-Revolutionary America, which earned the band a cult following, but also several legal threats.

== History ==
Culturcide's first single "Another Miracle"/"Consider Museums as Concentration Camps", was released in 1980, unsupported by any live appearances. However demand grew for the band to perform, and this they did, relying on banks of portable cassette recorders to provide their samples. This was enough of a success for their debut LP Year One (1982) to be composed entirely of live material. However, Craine left the band after the album's release. A remastered version of the album that also includes the first single was rereleased in 2007 as "Year One (Again)" by Hotbox Review

=== Another Miracle/Consider Museums 45 ===
The single was recorded at MRS Studio in Houston at the beginning of 1980, with Bobby Ginsburg doing the engineering on an 8-track board. Craine's earlier band, AK47, had recorded 'The Badge Means You Suck' there and Legionnaire's Disease had recorded their 'I'd Rather See You Dead' single in the studio, both using Ginsburg. Webb came equipped with lyrics for both songs while Craine had pre-worked the drum machine sounds and some synth sounds. Webb provided tape loops (the 'Don' and 'Adele' yells and screams denoted on the record sleeve) and Craine has said in previous interviews that he taped the climactic scene of the movie 'Attica' to provide the gunshots used at the end of 'Concentration Camps'. The tape loops were then 'treated' by running them through Craine's synth and the resulting output was duly recorded (Craine is alleged to have been a major Eno enthusiast). Webb and Craine enlisted guitarists Al Trazz (Plastic Idols) and Dan Workman To flesh out the initial sparse sound. While the Trazz parts were worked out and rehearsed in the studio, Workman's guitar tracks were improvised and done in one take in keeping with the band's initial Throbbing Gristle philosophy. Recording and mixing was done over two or three nights with no overdubbing or studio effects other than studio reverb supplied by Ginsburg. The cover illustration was done by Webb and the first pressing also included a self-addressed postcard showing the Houston Museum of Fine Art. Reviews were generally strong, including one that likened the band's sound to that of a 'stalking metronome'. Breaking their initial vow to never play live, Webb and Craine added Workman to the line-up and began to gig. After one such show, Bill Loner (Plastic Idols) declared the trio needed a bass player and he too was added to the band's ranks.

=== Tacky Souvenirs of Pre-Revolutionary America ===
In 1986 the band released their most famous work. Tacky Souvenirs of Pre-Revolutionary America comprised 14 tracks of the band's satirical lyrics overdubbed onto popular songs by the original artists. For example, the Beach Boys' "California Girls" was turned into "They Wish They All Could Be California Punks", a sideswipe at unoriginality in Punk Rock. There were also overdubs of tape loops and other sound effects. The lyric sheet carried the message "Home-taping is killing the record industry, so keep doing it." The backing tracks were used without permission and the band soon faced legal threats from some of the original copyright holders.

The album was listed in the British New Musical Express year list for 1987.

=== 1990s ===
Despite the band's new-found cult status (which led to tours of the US West Coast and even Europe), financial and intra-band problems led to a split in 1990. One problem was that most record labels shied away from releasing their material after Tacky Souvenirs.

However, in 1993 the band reconvened to work on a new album, Short CD (1995). Home Made Authority followed in 1998.

== Notes on gear ==
A Korg Minipops drum machine was used in the early work. Factory presets could be overridden by forcing down two of the rhythm selections simultaneously to provide a hybrid version, a tactic often used by Webb and Craine. Dan Workman favored a Les Paul through a Roland amp. He also shouted into the guitar pickups for additional vocal effects. Bill Loner usually played a Gibson EB3 and also provided the saxophone tracks. Loner also played an Arp Axxe on occasion, notably on the Year One Bongoloid tracks. Jim Craine played an EMS Synthi AKS. This particular version was equipped with an audio-in which allowed Craine to run outside sound sources through the synth for treatment, usually sampled cassette tapes assembled by Webb. Craine occasionally played a Hagstrom 8-string bass and a modified Arp Pro Soloist and provided flute tracks on at least one Year One song. Extra electronic percussion was provided by using very early Boss drum pad triggers. In addition to providing the vocals, Perry Webb assembled tape loops that were then amplified and played through the house PA system. Webb also played a Telecaster copy on selected songs during live performances.

== Discography ==
- 1980: "Another Miracle"/"Consider Museums as Concentration Camps" (7" single)
- 1981: Reset split LP with Hiroshima Chair; most of Culturcide's material later appeared on Year One.(Dogfood Production System)
- 1982: Year One (LP)(CIA Records)
- 1986: Tacky Souvenirs of Pre-Revolutionary America (LP)(no label)
- 1991: "A Day at My Job"/"Mommy and I Are One" (7" single)(Nuf Sed)
- 1995: Short CD (CD)(Double Naught)
- 1998: Home Made Authority (CD)(Delayed)
- Undated: "Santa Claus Was My Lover"/"Depressed Christmas" (7" single)
- Undated: split single with Caroliner Rainbow; two untitled tracks. (7" single) (cover states - "Collector's item! First 250,000 pressed on black vinyl")
- 2007: "Year One (Again) CD (HotBox Review), remastered version plus "Another Miracle" 45
- 2008: Gigs For An Imaginary Audience (CD) remastered versions of demos, previously unreleased tracks, and selected live tracks from 1980 to 1986

=== Compilation appearances ===
- 1982: "Disco" on cassette Endzeit (Datenverarbeitung)
- 1984: "Bestiality and Sex" on 4-cassette compilation of the same name (Bain Total).
- 1988: "Industrial Band" on the cassette Songs I Like to Sing (Statutory Tape).
- 2002: "They Aren't the World" on Illegal Art Exhibit CD (Illegal Art)
- 2005: "A Day at My Job (unreleased studio version)" on God Came Between Us CD (777 was 666)
- Undated: "Atomic Bomb" appeared on cassette compilation The Dog That Wouldn't Die.

== See also ==
- Negativland
- 1987 (What the Fuck Is Going On?)
- Sampling (music)

== Sources ==
- Band biography by Hobart Rowland
- Discography with more details
- Downloads and updated biography
