= Deluge (fireboat, 1949) =

Fireboat built for the Milwaukee, Wisconsin fire department

History
- Christened: 1 April 1949
- Out of service: 1984
- Fate: Sold c.1985

General characteristics
- Length: 96.5 ft (29.4 m)
- Beam: 23 ft (7.0 m)
- Draft: 6.75 ft (2.06 m)
- Installed power: 2 × 375 hp (280 kW) engines to power the watercannon; 2 × 375 hp (280 kW) engines to power both the vessel or the watercannon
- Propulsion: Twin screws
- Watercannon: 4 × 3,000 US gal/min (0.19 m^{3}/s); 1 aft on an extendable tower 1 forward equipped to spray foam

Deluge was a fireboat built for the Milwaukee, Wisconsin fire department. She was christened on 1 April 1949. According to The Milwaukee Journal, "Deluge will be the most modern and one of the most powerful fire fighting craft west of New York city."

Deluge had a low enough profile to proceed under the State Street Bascule Bridge and the Cherry Street Bascule Bridge, without requiring them to be raised.

Deluge was Milwaukee's first diesel powered fireboat. According to an article published in Pacific Marine, shortly after her launch, diesel's advantages included: smaller crew; a crew requiring less specialized skills; and a lower profile, that enabled the Deluge to go under Milwaukee's low bridges to fight fires on her rivers.

In 1978 The Milwaukee Journal reported that a recent refit had made her the only fireboat in North America equipped with an aqueous film forming foam delivery system.

Deluge was retired in 1984. The last fire she fought was in 1975. She was to be replaced by an amphibious firefighting vehicle, sparing the cost of the eight crew trained to operate Deluge.

In 1986 the chief of Milwaukee's fire department and the head of the firefighter's union disagreed on whether Deluge's replacement was safe. Joseph Ruditys, President of the Milwaukee Professional Firefighters Association noted that the vessel was a used vessel, that dated back to service in the War in Vietnam, and that it had required 600 hours of repairs. Chief William Stamm said the repairs were normal, and that the new vessel was safer than Deluge.
