= The Flood (1927 film) =

1927 film

- Directed by: Josef Berger
- Written by: Robert Erdmannsdorffer
- Cinematography: Alfons Brümmer; Günther Krampf; Theodor Sparkuhl
- Production company: Gäa-Film
- Release date: 1927
- Country: Germany
- Languages: Silent; German intertitles

The Flood (German:Sindflut) is a 1927 German silent film directed by and starring Josef Berger.
