= Deluge Mountain =

Mountain in British Columbia, Canada

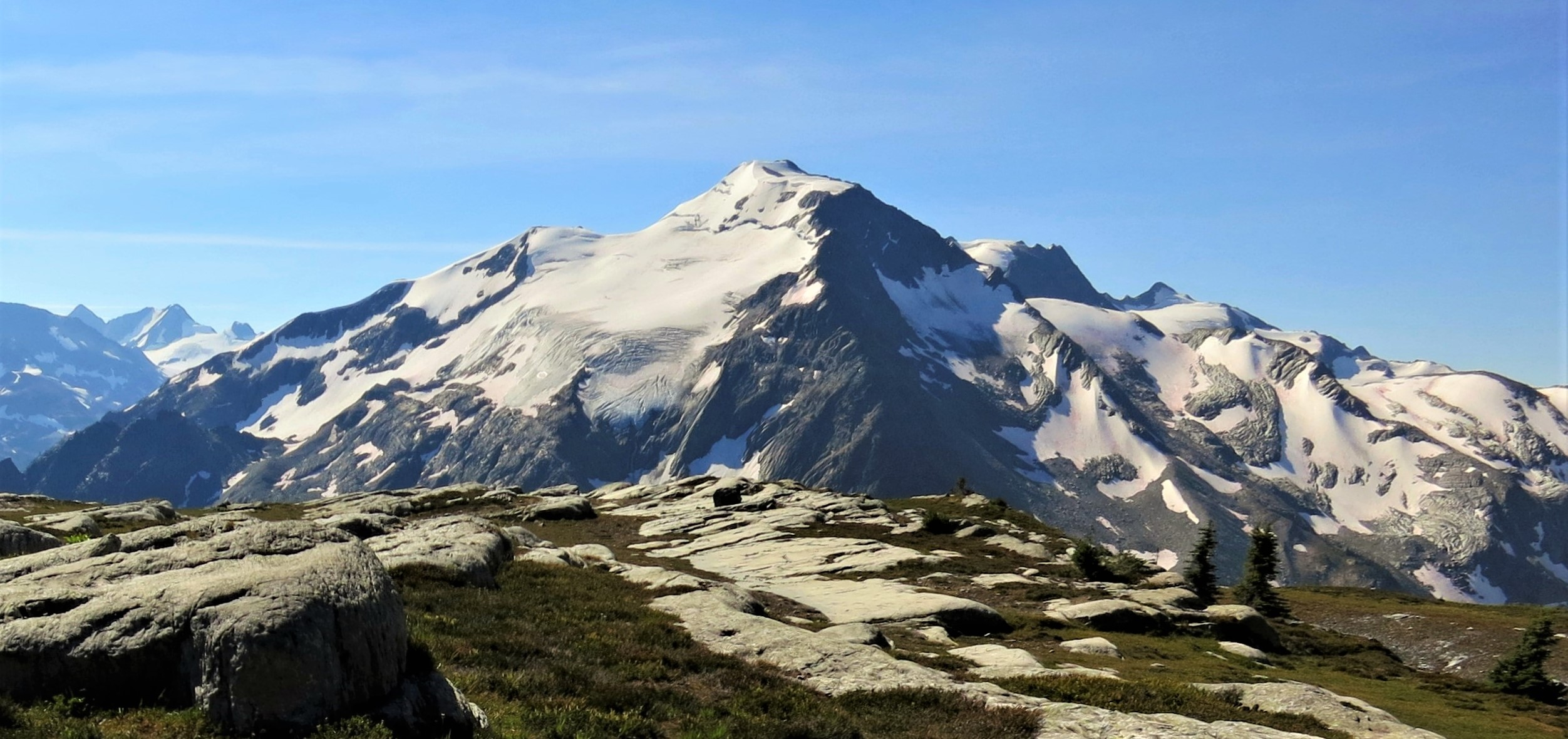
- North aspect

Highest point
- Elevation: 2,789 m (9,150 ft)
- Prominence: 165 m (541 ft)
- Listing: Mountains of British Columbia
- Coordinates: 50°51′00″N 117°03′00″W

Geography
- Location within British Columbia Location within Canada
- Interactive map of Deluge Mountain
- Location: British Columbia, Canada
- District: Kootenay Land District
- Parent range: Purcell Mountains; Columbia Mountains
- Topo map: NTS 82K14 Westfall River

Geology
- Rock age: Proterozoic
- Mountain type: Fault block

Deluge Mountain is a mountain summit located in British Columbia, Canada.

== Description ==
Deluge Mountain is a 2,789-metre-elevation (9,150-foot) peak situated 20 kilometres (12 miles) northwest of The Bugaboos, in the Purcell Mountains which are a subrange of the Columbia Mountains. Precipitation runoff from Deluge Mountain's southwest slope drains to the Duncan River, and from all other slopes into Crystalline Creek and eventually the Spillimacheen River. Topographic relief is significant as the summit rises 1,200 metres (3,900 feet) above the Crystalline valley in 2 kilometres (1.2 miles).

== Etymology ==
The mountain's name was submitted for official consideration in 1955 by mountaineer Peter Robinson (1932–2019). The landform was presumably named in 1954 by Robinson, who climbed in the area that year when his climbing party became drenched and cold while camped across the valley from this mountain. Sometimes the peak can be seen from Crystalline valley during a rain storm, with its summit shrouded in clouds and a waterfall pouring from its north slope. A deluge is a large downpour of rain, often a flood. The mountain's toponym was officially adopted June 9, 1960, by the Geographical Names Board of Canada.

== Climate ==
Based on the Köppen climate classification, Deluge Mountain is located in a subarctic climate zone with cold, snowy winters, and mild summers. Temperatures in winter can drop below −20 °C with wind chill factors below −30 °C. This climate supports unnamed glaciers on the mountain's slopes.

== Gallery ==
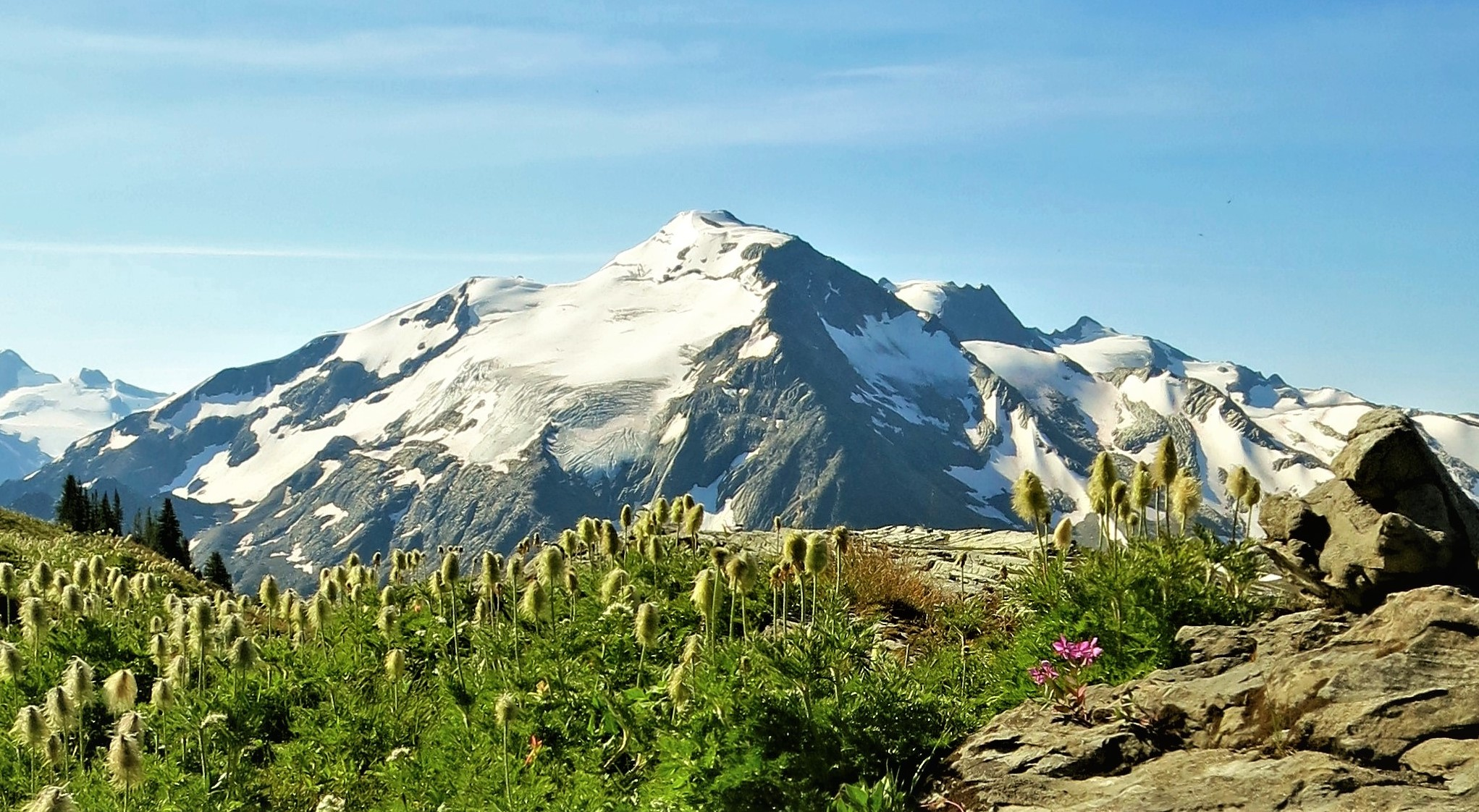
Deluge Mountain

== See also ==
- Geography of British Columbia
- Purcell Supergroup
