= Deluge (fireboat, 1923) =

Fireboat in Louisiana

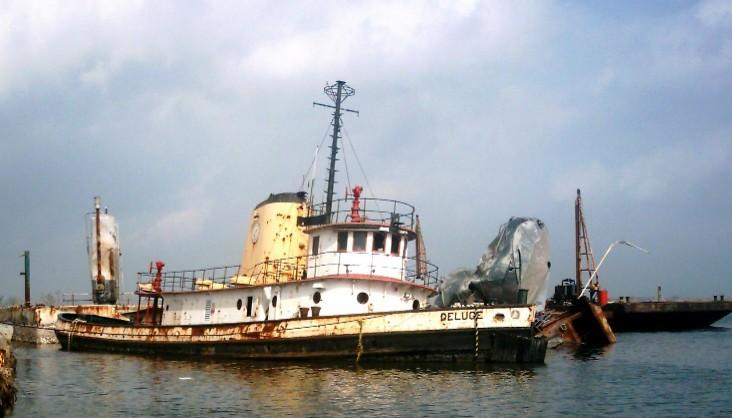

History

United States
- Name: SS Deluge
- Builder: Johnson Drydock & Shipbuilding Co.
- Launched: 1923
- Out of service: 1992
- Status: Awaiting restoration/scrapping

General characteristics
- Tonnage: 187 tons (net), 372 tons (gross)
- Displacement: 370 tons
- Length: 138.8 ft (42.3 m)
- Beam: 29 ft (8.8 m)
- Draft: 14.6 ft (4.5 m)
- Deluge (Firefighting Tug)
- U.S. National Register of Historic Places
- Former U.S. National Historic Landmark
- Location: Mississippi River, north of Canal St.–Algiers Ferry, New Orleans, Louisiana
- Built: 1923
- Architect: Cornell, H.E.; Et al.
- NRHP reference No.: 89001427

Significant dates
- Added to NRHP: June 30, 1989
- Designated NHL: June 30, 1989
- Delisted NHL: December 11, 2023

Deluge is a fireboat (also referred to as a firefighting tug) in New Orleans, Louisiana. Built by Johnson Drydock & Shipbuilding Co. of New Orleans in 1923, she was declared a National Historic Landmark in 1989. She was the nation's second oldest fireboat at the time.

In March 1930, a fire broke out on the freighter Scantic, lasting two days. Ten crew members were killed. It was the first major fire the Deluge had to put out. In March 1958, a schoolhouse was on fire in Algiers. The Deluge helped aid the firemen by dousing the school with a quarter of a million gallons of water from the river.

The most famous fire battled by the Deluge was the Christmas Eve fire in 1950. A barge with crude oil smashed into the Standard Oil tanker Baltimore, resulting in an oil spill. Fire quickly engulfed the oil, and from the docks it looked as though the river were on fire. Deluge quickly arrived and peppered the boats and the surrounding area with gallons of water. Successfully, the fireboat ended the threat.

It was common for Deluge to fight forty fires a year. Along with battling fires, Deluge also completed other tasks. She completed numerous towing jobs as well as maintenance after a fire had occurred. This usually required clearing the silt off of docks and boats. Deluge would also rescue floating barges and boats and bring them back to the docks.

The Deluge was retired in 1992.

In 2000, she was no longer operational and would require hundreds of thousands of dollars to fix. It was possible the fireboat would be stripped for scrap metal if no buyer came forward, as the maintenance for the boat was steadily increasing. Due to an absence of reliable information concerning the boat's condition since its sale in 2000, her National Historic Landmark designation was withdrawn in 2023, although Deluge remains on the National Register of Historic Places.
