= Multiphase heat transfer =

A multiphase flow system is one characterized by the simultaneous presence of several phases, the two-phase system being the simplest case. The term ‘two-component’ is sometimes used to describe flows in which the phases consist of different chemical substances. However, since the same mathematics describes two-phase and two-component flows, the two expressions can be treated as synonymous.

Analysis of multiphase systems can include consideration of multiphase flow and multiphase heat transfer. The former occurs only if all parts are at the same temperature, but interphase heat transfer also occurs when the temperatures of the individual phases are different.

If different phases of the same pure substance are present in a multiphase system, interphase heat transfer will result in a change of phase, which is always accompanied by interphase mass transfer.

== Definitions ==
A multiphase flow system is one characterized by the simultaneous presence of several phases, the two-phase system being the simplest case. The term ‘two-component’ is sometimes used to describe flows in which the phases consist of different chemical substances. For example, steam-water flows are two-phase, while air-water flows are two-component. Some two-component flows (mostly liquid-liquid) technically consist of a single phase but are identified as two-phase flows in which the term “phase” is applied to each of the components. Since the same mathematics describes two-phase and two-component flows, the two expressions can be treated as synonymous.

== Multiphase flow versus heat transfer ==
The analysis of multiphase systems can include consideration of multiphase flow and multiphase heat transfer. When all of the phases in a multiphase system exist at the same temperature, multiphase flow is the only concern. However, when the temperatures of the individual phases are different, interphase heat transfer also occurs.

== Phase-change heat transfer ==
If different phases of the same pure substance are present in a multiphase system, interphase heat transfer will result in a change of phase, which is always accompanied by interphase mass transfer. The combination of heat transfer with mass transfer during phase change makes multiphase systems distinctly more challenging than simpler systems. Based on the phases that are involved in the system, phase change problems can be classified as: (1) solid–liquid phase change (melting and solidification), (2) solid–vapor phase change (sublimation and deposition), and (3) liquid–vapor phase change (boiling/evaporation and condensation). Melting and sublimation are also referred to as fluidification because both liquid and vapor are regarded as fluids.
