= Stratified flows =

Flows of liquids with varying density

Stratified flows are flows in a fluid whose density varies, often with less dense fluid vertically above denser fluid. In these flows, buoyancy forces can cause waves, vorticies, and turbulence. When density decreases in the rising vertical direction, the flow is stably stratified.

Stratified flows are a common feature of Earth's oceans and atmosphere. For example, the thermocline in the upper ocean is stably stratified owing to warmer, less salty water overlying colder saltier water below.

== Stratified fluid ==
A stratified fluid may be defined as the fluid with density variations in the vertical direction. For example, air and water; both are fluids and if we consider them together then they can be seen as a stratified fluid system. Density variations in the atmosphere profoundly affect the motion of water and air. Wave phenomena in air flow over the mountains and occurrence of smog are the examples of stratification effect in the atmosphere. When a fluid system having a condition in which fluid density decreases with height, is disturbed, then the gravity and friction restore the undisturbed conditions. If however the fluid tends to be stable if density decreases with height.

== Upstream motions in stratified flow ==
It is known that the sub critical flow of a stratified fluid past a barrier produce motions upstream of the barrier. Sub critical flow may be defined as a flow for which the Froude number based on channel height is less than 1/π, so that one or more stationary lee waves would be present. Some of the upstream motions do not decompose with the distance upstream. These ‘columnar’ modes have zero frequency and a sinusoidal structure in the direction of the density gradient; they effectively lead to a continuous change in upstream conditions. If the barrier is two-dimensional (i.e. of infinite extent in the direction perpendicular to the upstream flow and the direction of density gradient), inviscid theories show that the length of the upstream region affected by the columnar modes increases without bound as t->infinity. Non-zero viscosity (and/or diffusivity) will, however, limit the region affected, since the wave amplitudes will then slowly decay.

== Efficient mixing in stratified flows ==
Turbulent mixing in stratified flows is described by mixing efficiency. This mixing efficiency compares the energy used in irreversible mixing, enlarging the minimum gravitational potential energy that can be kept in the density field, to the entire change in mechanical energy during the mixing process. It can be defined either as an integral quantity, calculated between inert initial and final conditions or as a fraction of the energy flux to mixing and the power into the system. These two definitions can give different values if the system is not in steady state. Mixing efficiency is especially important in oceanography as mixing is required to keep the overall stratification in a steady-state ocean. The entire amount of mixing in the oceans is equal to the product of the power input to the ocean and the mean mixing efficiency.

== Stability criteria for stratified flow ==
Wallis and Dobson (1973) estimate their criterion with transition observations that they call “Slugging” and note that empirically the stability limit is described by $j^* = 0.5 \alpha^{3/2}$

Here $\alpha= {\left ( \frac{h_{G}}{H} \right )}$ and $j^*= \left [ \frac{U_{G}\alpha{\sqrt{\rho_{G}}}}{\sqrt{gH(\rho_{L}-\rho_{G})}} \right ] \quad$ where H is channel height and U, h and ρ denote the mean velocity, holdup and density respectively. The subscripts G and L stand for gas and liquid and g denotes Gravity. Taitel and Dukler (1976) [TD] expanded the (Kelvin and helmholtz) KH analysis first to the case of a finite wave on a flat liquid sheet in horizontal channel flow and then to finite waves on stratified liquid in an Inclined pipe. In order to apply this criterion they need to provide the equilibrium liquid level hL (or liquid holdup). They calculate $h_{L}$ through momentum balances in the gas and liquid phases (two fluid models) in which shear stresses are examine and assessed using conventional friction factors definitions. In two fluid models, the pipe geometry is taken into consideration through wetted perimeters by the gas and liquid phases, including the gas-liquid interface. This states that the wall resistance of the liquid is similar to that for open-channel flow and that of the gas to close-duct flow. This geometry analysis is general and could be applied not only to round pipes, but to any other possible shape. In this method, each pair of superficial gas and liquid velocity relates to a distinctive value of $h_{L}$.

According to [TD], a finite wave will grow in a horizontal rectangular channel of height H, when $j^* > {\left ( 1- \frac{h_{L}}{H} \right ) \alpha^{3/2}}$ or $U_{G} > {\left (1- \frac{h_{L}}{H}\right)}{\left (\frac{(\rho_{L}-\rho_{G})g A_{G}}{\rho_{G}dA_{L}/dh_{L}}\right)^{1/2}}$ for inclined pipe. D is the pipe diameter and A is the cross section area. Note that ${\left ( 1- \frac{h_{L}}{H} \right )} = \alpha$. If ${\left (\frac{h_{L}}{H} \right )}=0.5$, ${\left ( 1- \frac{h_{L}}{H} \right )}=0.5$, and this is compatible with the result of Wallis and Dobson(1973) The [TD] overall procedure result to a weak dependence on viscosity, through the calculation of $h_{L}$.

[TD] also identify two kinds of stratified flow: stratified smooth (SS) and stratified wavy (SW). These waves, as they say, “are produced by the gas flow under conditions where the velocity of gas is enough to cause waves to form, but slower than that needed for the quick wave growth which leads transition to intermittent or annular flow.” [TD] suggest a standard to predict the transition from stratified smooth to stratified wavy flow, based on Jeffreys’ (1925, 1926) ideas.

== Effects of stratification on diffusion ==
Density stratification has significant effect on diffusion in fluids. For example, smoke which is coming from a chimney diffuses turbulently if the earth atmosphere is not stably stratified. When the lower air is in stable condition, as in morning or early evening, the smoke comes out and become flat into a long, thin layer. Strong stratification, or inversions as they are called sometimes, restrict contaminants to the lower regions of the earth atmosphere, and cause many of our current air-pollution problems.
