= Mark Flood (artist) =

American painter (born 1957)

Mark Flood (born 1957 in Houston, Texas) is an American artist.

Flood has been making art for 30 years and graduated with a Bachelor of Arts from Rice University in 1981. He sings in the band Culturcide under the stage name Perry Webb. Mark Flood is represented by Stuart Shave/Modern Art, London and KARMA, New York.

In 2012, Randy Kennedy wrote in the New York Times that Flood was "a founder of the underground 1980s band Culturcide" who "never sold enough work to say goodbye to his day jobs (Texaco office worker, elementary school teacher's assistant, video clerk, museum assistant").

== Work ==
Flood has worked in several media and formats such as painting, installation, artist's books and photo-collage. His paintings created with lace have been called "spinster abstraction". The process involves collecting lace and shredding it, soaking the lace in paint, and then draping it over a painted canvas. A pattern is left on the canvas after removing the lace. Another series of paintings include stenciled and spray-painted texts that read, "Another Painting", "3 More Paintings" and 25 More Paintings."

In 2012, Flood created a pop-up exhibition space in Miami called Mark Flood Resents, where art works were presented in a casual scattering and nothing was for sale. Hyperallergic described the project as a place where "conversations and exchanges about art seemed to tie and hold everything together" in a grungy punk-rock madhouse where "everything and nothing seemed to be art.

In 2021 Flood collaborated with the jewelry company, love for both of us, on a series of pendants in bronze and gold that referenced Greek sculptures.

== Selected exhibitions ==
Flood has had solo exhibitions at KARMA, New York; the Contemporary Arts Museum Houston; Peres Projects, Berlin, Germany; the Contemporary Art Museum of St Louis; Zach Feuer Gallery, New York; Galerie Rüdiger Schöttle, Munich, Germany; Luxembourg & Dayan, London; American Fine Art, New York; Rubell Museum, Miami, among other venues.

== Collections ==
- Birmingham Art Museum, Birmingham, Ala.
- The Cornell Fine Arts Museum, Rollins College, Winter Park, Fla.
- Dallas Museum of Art, Dallas
- The Menil Collection, Houston
- Modern Art Museum of Fort Worth, Fort Worth
- The Museum of Fine Arts, Houston

== Bibliography ==
- Clerk Fluid (2009, File Under Alleged Art Writing)
- Wartscene USA (February 2010)
- The Hateful Years (August 2012)
- Mark Flood: Greatest Hits (August 2016, Contemporary Arts Museum, Houston, ISBN 978-1933619590)
