= Hulda Flood =

Swedish politician (1886–1968)

Hulda Flood

Hulda Flood (25 September 1886 – 18 November 1968) was a Swedish politician (Social Democrat), feminist and trade unionist.

Flood was born in Eda församling, Värmlands län. She was born in a poor family, and worked as farmhand, a domestic maid and in a tailor workshop. Early on, she became active in Trade unionist work, the Social Democratic movement, and women's rights.

As a Trade unionist, she was active within the Arbetarnas bildningsförbund. As a women's activist, one of the most important issues for her was to protect women by organising them in Trade Unions. As a Social Democrat, she was active in organising local Social Democratic women's clubs around the country, which in organised women in Trade Union work and voiced their rights within the labour movement. She also made study journeys to Russia, the United States and Australia.

Flood was Chairman of the Social Democratic Women's Club in Karlstad in 1910–1912, Secretary of the Social Democratic Women's District of Värmland in 1915–1922, Member of the City Council of Karlstad in 1919–1922, Dispatcher of the Social Democratic Women in Sweden in 1925–1929, Co-Party Secretary of the Swedish Social Democratic Party in 1928–1948, Board Member of the Social Democratic Women in Sweden in 1928–1944, and Member of Parliament of the Upper Chamber in 1948–1949. She also served as a Lay judge, and was the first woman Board Member of the Sveriges Radio.

In 1939, she published Den socialdemokratiska kvinnorörelsen i Sverige (literary: 'The Social Democratic Women's Movement in Sweden'), which was republished in 1960 and used in University studies.

Hulda Flood was married to the tailor Karl Andersson and had no children.
