= List of petroleum industry occupations =

This is a list of petroleum occupations, including jobs in exploration, extraction, refining, transportation, and related fields.

- Corrosion engineer
- Chemical engineer
- Derrickhand
- Driller (oil)
- Drilling engineer
- Environmental engineer
- Hydrologist
- Landman (oil worker)
- Mud engineer
- Mud logging technician
- Oil platform crew
- Oil terminal operator
- Offshore geotechnical engineer
- Offshore installation manager
- Petrochemist
- Petroleum engineer
- Petroleum geologist
- Petroleum production engineering
- Petroleum technician
- Petrophysicist
- Pipefitter
- Pipelayer
- Pipeline operator
- Plant operator
- Process engineer
- Production engineer
- Pumpman
- Reservoir engineer
- Roughneck
- Roustabout
- Seismic data analyst
- Subsurface engineer
- Surveying
- Tank truck driver
- Tool pusher
- Well logging technician

== See also ==
- Heavy equipment operators
- List of components of oil drilling rigs
- List of industrial occupations
- List of largest oil and gas companies by revenue
- List of oilfield service companies
- Lists of occupations
- LNG terminal and Oil terminal
- LNG carrier and Oil tanker
- New drilling technologies
- Petroleum industry
- Pipe-laying ship
- Seafarer's professions and ranks
- Society of Petroleum Engineers
- Subsea technology
