= Dry hole =

Dry hole may refer to:

- an oil well without significant amounts of oil (see also Hydrocarbon exploration)
- an unsuccessful business venture
- David Harold Byrd, nicknamed "Dry Hole", American businessman

== See also ==
- Dry-hole clause, in oil and gas contract law
