= Tool pusher =

Oil drilling occupation

A tool pusher (sometimes toolpusher, pusher, or The Push) is an occupation within the oil drilling industry.

On a land drilling rig the tool pusher may be rig manager and responsible for all operations, but on drillships and offshore oil rigs, tool pushers are department heads in charge of the drilling department. They are therefore responsible for supervision and management of the drilling department. They report to the Master or Offshore Installation Manager (OIM) depending on the company - who in turn reports to a shore-based rig manager. Other department heads include the chief mate and chief engineer.

Tool pushers are in charge of the rig's necessary tools, equipment, and supplies. They work closely in conjunction with the representative of the operating/exploration company (i.e., company man) in regard to the actual drilling of the well. In recent times, tool pushers also have taken on somewhat of an administrative role, as they frequently do paperwork related to the rig crew regarding payroll, benefits, and related matters. Tool pushers are also responsible for coordinating services with third party companies related to the drilling of the well.

Tool pushers usually start at an entry-level position (i.e., a roustabout or roughneck) and work their way up over time. With the advancement in offshore drilling technology, cyberbase drilling experience is usually required before a driller can be promoted to the position of tool pusher.

Certifications include:

1. Basic Offshore Safety Induction and Emergency Training (BOSIET)
2. Well Control Certificate (Supervisor Level, Surface/Subsea BOP Stack issued by an institution approved by IWCF)

== See also ==
- Drilling engineering
- Glossary of oilfield jargon
- List of petroleum industry occupations
