= Units used in petroleum engineering =

List of units used in the oil industry

Several units of volume are used in petroleum engineering.

== Units ==
Unit		Thousand	Million	Billion (10^{9})
cubic meter	m3	E3m3 (sometimes referred to as a "dec")	E6m3	
barrel	bbl	Mbbl	MMbbl	
Standard cubic feet	scf	Mscf	MMscf	Bcf

Due to the risk of confusion with the SI convention where the "M" prefix stands for "mega" representing million, the Society of Petroleum Engineers recommends in their style guide that abbreviations or prefixes M or MM are not used for barrels of oil or barrel of oil equivalent, but rather that thousands, millions or billions are spelled out.

== Conversion factors ==
- Oil conversion factor from m³ to bbl (or stb) is 6.28981100
- Gas conversion factor from standard m³ to scf is 35.314666721

Note that the m³ gas conversion factor takes into account a difference in the standard temperature base for measurement of gas volumes in metric and imperial units. The standard temperature for metric measurement is 15 degrees Celsius (i.e. 59 degrees Fahrenheit) while for English measurement the standard temperature is 60 °F. Gas undergoes a slight expansion when the temperature is raised from 15 °C (59 °F) to 60 °F and this expansion is built into the above factor for gas.

The standard temperature and pressure (STP) for gas varies depending on the particular code being used. It is just as important to know the standard pressure as the temperature. Formerly, OPEC used 101.325 kPa (14.696 psia) but now the standard is 101.560 kPa (14.73 psia).
