= Roughneck =

Person whose job is hard labor

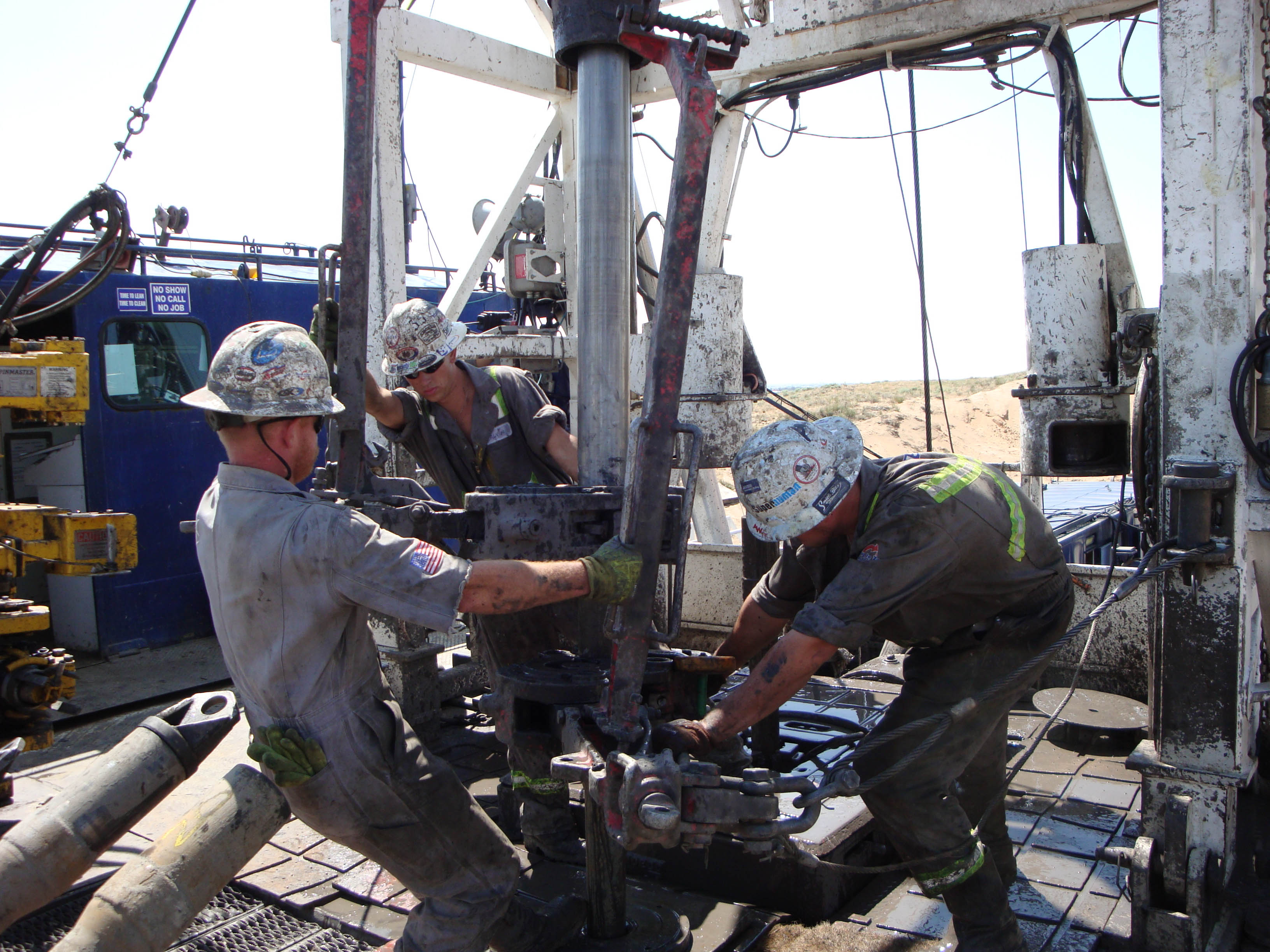
Roughnecks on a drilling rig

A roughneck is a person whose occupation is hard manual labor. The term applies across a number of industries, but is most commonly associated with the workers on a drilling rig. The ideal of the hard-working, tough roughneck has been adopted by several sports teams who use the word as part of their name or logo.

Originally the term was used in the traveling carnivals of 19th-century United States, almost interchangeably with roustabout. By the 1930s the terms had transferred to the oil drilling industry, with roughneck used for those who worked on the floor of a drilling rig handling specialised drilling equipment for drilling and pressure controls. By contrast, a roustabout would perform general labor, such as loading and unloading cargo from crane baskets and assisting welders, mechanics, electricians and other skilled workers.

== Oil field roughnecks ==
An oil field roughneck's duties can include anything involved with connecting pipe down the well bore, as well as general work around a rig. The crew of a land-based oil rig can be further divided into several positions:

- Tool pusher: The highest position at the drilling location, responsible for every crew. A toolpusher may stay on location for a few days or weeks at a time during operations, whereas individual drilling crews work only eight- or 12-hour shifts or "tours" (pronounced as "towers").
- Driller: The head of an individual crew, responsible for controlling a rig's machinery during drilling, as well as most other rig operations.
- Derrickhand (derrick-man): Responsible for the drilling mud, the mud pits where drilling fluids are circulated in the system, and the mud pumps, as well as being the hand up in the derrick manipulating stands into and out of the fingers during tripping operations. Acting as a lead for the driller who is mostly restricted to the rig floor. In many cases, the derrickman is exclusively responsible for work in the derrick during "tripping" pipe in and out of the hole.
- Pit Watcher: Responsible for the drilling mud, the mud pits, and associated pumping/circulating of mud and various fluids through the pits, downhole, and returning through the pits.
- Motorman (motorhand): Responsible for maintenance of various engines, water pumps, water lines, steam lines, boilers and various other machinery incorporated into the rig daily. Also responsible for the movement of equipment on site. On a four-man drilling crew, the motorman is also the chainhand.
- Boilerman: Though this position is now obsolete, before the mid-20th century, when most rigs were steam-powered, the boilerman was responsible for the boilers. The boilerman also functioned as the laundryman, steam-cleaning the last crew's greasy work clothes in the "blow barrel" and then hanging them up to dry in the warm air near the boilers.
- Chainhand (Floorhand): This position is given to a floor hand that can also throw the chain that helps spin up the connections, but as of 2013 with some tasks being automated on the drilling rigs is pretty much just another floor hand that watches out for the worm and does not get as filthy.
- Leadhand/Floorhand ("worm"): Usually the lowest member of the drilling crew, those in this position are often nicknamed "worm", because this hand has the dirtiest and most physically demanding position. The floor hand works primarily on the rig floor where he is the one actually operating the tongs, iron roughneck, tugger, and catwalk, and doing pretty much any other job that is asked of him.
- Roustabout (lease hand): On bigger rigs and offshore rigs, a roustabout does most of the painting and cleaning so roughnecks can take care of other work.
- Ginsel: The worm's helper. This is also a derogatory insult among roughnecks. Also called the fifth hand.
- Iron roughneck is also a specialized equipment used in oil drilling operations. Whether the pipe is being fed into the wellbore or it is being taken out, the iron roughneck uses a rotary table and torque wrench(es) to make up or break down the pipe.

In Canada on land-based rigs, the term roughneck refers to the floorhand.

== Cultural references ==
The Edmonton Oilers of the National Hockey League used to use an oil rigging roughneck with an ice hockey stick as one of their secondary logos. The roughneck, as a symbol of hard work and fortitude, was the inspiration for the Calgary Roughnecks lacrosse team, as well as the Tulsa Roughnecks of the North American Soccer League, the Tulsa Roughnecks of the United Soccer Leagues, and the Tulsa Roughnecks FC of the USL. The West Texas Roughnecks of the Indoor Football League also use this nickname. In the BAFA National Leagues, the Aberdeen Roughnecks have also adopted the nickname. In the AUDL (American Ultimate Disc League) the Dallas team is also the Roughnecks. One of the inaugural teams of the revamped XFL was the Houston Roughnecks.

In Chapter 3 of The Great Gatsby, on first meeting Jay Gatsby, Nick Carraway describes him as looking like "an elegant young rough-neck, a year or two over thirty, whose elaborate formality of speech just missed being absurd."

Johnny Cash wrote and performed a song called "Born to Be a Roughneck".

Several television programs have focused on the roughneck life, including Oil Strike North (1975), Roughnecks (1994–1995), and Black Gold (2008–2013).

Stan Rogers's song "Free in the Harbour", about the migration of Atlantic fisherman to the oil industry for work, describes these migrants as "Calgary Roughnecks from Hermitage Bay."

The 1997 movie Starship Troopers features a Mobile Infantry unit, call-sign Roughnecks Two-Zero. Initially nicknamed "Rasczak's Roughnecks" after their commanding officer, the unit is eventually commanded by the film's protagonist, Johnny Rico, becoming "Rico's Roughnecks".

== See also ==
- Company man
- Drilling engineering
- Glossary of oilfield jargon
- Miner
- Redneck
- Tool pusher
