= Subsurface engineer =

Subsurface engineers (also known as "completion engineers") are a subset within Petroleum Engineering and typically work closely with Drilling engineers. The job of a Subsurface Engineer is to effectively select equipment that will best suit the subsurface environment in order to best produce the hydrocarbon reserves. Once the hardware has been selected, a Subsurface Engineer will monitor and adjust the equipment to ensure the well and reservoir produces under ideal circumstances.

== Overview ==
Subsurface engineers must design a successful well completion system by selecting equipment that is adequate for both downhole environments and applications. Considerations must be given to the various functions under which the completion equipment must operate and the effects any changes in temperatures or differential pressure will have on the equipment. The completion system must also be efficient and cost effective to achieve maximum production and financial goals. Another factor in the selection of specific completion equipment is the production rates of the well. The typical job duties of a Subsurface engineer include managing the interface between the reservoir and the well, including perforations, sand control, artificial lift, downhole flow control, and downhole monitoring equipment. Additional responsibilities of a Subsurface engineer include: performing a cost and risk analysis on the design, contacting vendors for the rental, purchase, and shipment of equipment, and working closely with fellow employees (geologists, reservoir engineers, drilling engineers, and production engineers).

The Society of Petroleum Engineers (SPE) has technical disciplines which allow SPE members to focus their attention on the technical activities that most interest them. Drilling and Completions historically have been intertwined work within Petroleum Engineering. In 2016, SPE split the Drilling and Completions technical disciplines so SPE members would be able to focus more on Drilling or Completions. SPE continues to publish the SPE Drilling & Completions journal, it has been publishing the journal since 1993. SPE illustrates the technical activities of Drilling and Completions on its website and also hosts a page about SPE offerings related to Completions engineering. SPE also has many on demand webinars on Completions topics.

== Design Components ==
The design components considered to perform a well completion may include:

- Cost and risk analysis
- Determining the specifications for the wellbore clean-out
- Use of specific Packer assemblies
- Determining specific tool selection to operate equipment within the well
- Assess possible equipment load specifications and incorporation of safety factors
- Best use of flow control accessories (sliding sleeves and safety valves)
- Determining the appropriate perforating shots per foot and charges based on the target formations
- Acidifying the formation to inhibit flow of hydrocarbons
- Sand Control operations to increase production
- Prevention of formation sand production with the use of wire screens
- Review Well logs to determine equipment placement within the well
- Determination of specific production pipe regarding well flow rates
- Selection of equipment to maintain well stability
- Oversee completion operations

== Suggested Reading ==
Clegg, Joe Dunn. Production Operations Engineering. Richardson, TX: SPE, 2007. Print.
