= Pietro Barbaro =

Italian ship and transport company

Pietro Barbaro S.p.A.
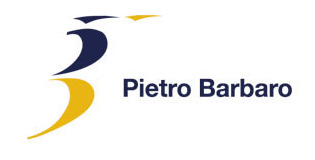
- Type: join-stock company
- Industry: Petroleum transport; Shipping; Tourism
- Founded: Palermo, Italy (1885)
- Founder: Marcello Barbaro
- Headquarters: Palermo, Italy
- Key people: Alfredo Barbaro (Owner); Giovanni Barbaro (Owner); Federica Barbaro (CEO)
- Revenue: €120 million (2011)
- Number of employees: 2000 (2011)
- Subsidiaries: Prime Shipping; PB Tankers; Pietro Barbaro Tourism
- Website: pietrobarbaro.com

Pietro Barbaro S.p.A. is an Italian ship transport company founded in 1885, working in petroleum transport, shipping and tourism, with headquarters in Palermo. In 2011 it employed about 2,000 employees and generated a yearly turnover of 120 million Euros.

== History ==
Pietro Barbaro S.p.A. is a company born out of "Marcello Barbaro & figli", a company founded in 1885 by Marcello Barbaro and worked in the processing and transport of coal used as fuel for industrial and domestic purposes.

In 1906, after being passed to Pietro Barbaro, grandson of Marcello, the company changed its name to "Barbaro Capitano Pietro & Figli", later shortened to the current "Pietro Barbaro".

In 1970 the brothers Alfredo and Giovanni Barbaro, great-grandchildren of Pietro, transformed the company into a joint-stock company, which manages of a group of businesses working in ship transport, inland navigation, and in the tourism sector.

In the '80s the group began transporting chemical and petroleum products through its partnership with the Fagioli Group, from which Finaval was born, and with the Marnavi Group, from which Novamar was founded. It also began transporting dry goods with the group CoeClerici from which Somocar and Bulkitalia were founded.

Since 1982 the company has begun the inland transportation of fuel oil for the thermal power stations on the river Po together with Fluvio Padana, a company that by 1996 was managing 80% of the whole Po river transport, amounting to 95,000 tons per km.

In 1992 the company launched "Isola Blue", the first double-hulled ship ever built in Italy by Petrotank JV, a company formed by with Fratelli D'Amico, Rosina, Ferruzzi and Almare.

In 2006 by the Barbaro Group acquired "Prime Shipping Llc", a company for the inland transport of petroleum products, based in Samara in Russia. In the same year it founded PB Tankers a company engaged in the maritime transport of petroleum products.

In 2015 Pietro Barbaro has sold its entire shareholding of Prime Shipping Llc to a joint venture formed by Rosneft, Sberbank Investments and by Pietro Barbaro S.p.A. itself, who had remained as a minority shareholder, having already signed in 2014 a binding agreement for the sale of 95% Prime Shipping of the Russian company Rosneft.

In 2016 Pietro Barbaro S.p.A. and Rosneft, a Russian company active in the production and refining of hydrocarbons, have signed a memorandum of understanding to establish a maritime transportation joint venture, with an involvement of the Barbaro group in transportation and logistics.

Since July 6, 2017 Federica Barbaro has become CEO of Pietro Barbaro S.p.A.

== Activity sectors ==
Through its various companies, Pietro Barbaro S.p.A. is operational in the following sectors:

- Maritime transport of petroleum products – through PB Tankers.
- Inland transportation of petroleum products – through Prime Shipping.
- Tourism in Sicily – through Pietro Barbaro Tourism.
- Maritime agency in Sicily.

== Honours ==
In 2014, Pietro Barbaro has received a recognition from Eurostandard – an international non-governmental organization based in Moscow which certifies compliance with international standards in the quality of production and industrial management – for its efficiency and care for the environment during the course of the production cycle.

== Turnover ==
	Year	Turnover (€)
Pietro Barbaro Group	2007	120 million
Pietro Barbaro Group	2009	100 million
Pietro Barbaro Group	2010	120 million
Pietro Barbaro Group	2011	120 million
Prime Shipping	2009	22 million
Prime Shipping	2011	45 million
Prime Shipping	2013	90 million
PB Tankers	2011	120 million

== Management ==
Federica Barbaro is the CEO of Pietro Barbaro S.p.A. and PB Tankers.

== Fleet ==
Name	Typology	Year	Capacity (cubic meters)	Dimensions
Ice Point	Tanker Ice Class 1A	2008	51.000	183x32,2x13,2 m
Iron Point	Tanker Ice Class 1A	2008	51.000	183x32,2x13,2 m
Indian Point	Tanker Ice Class 1A	2008	51.000	183x32,2x13,2 m
Gold Point	Tanker Ice Class 1A	2011	50.400	183x32,2x13,1 m
Silver Point	Tanker Ice Class 1A	2011	50.400	183x32,2x13,1 m
Rosita (hired)	Product Tanker	2004	38,000	171x32,2x13,1 m
