= Marcello Barbaro =

Marcello barbaro
- Born: 20 April 1829; Palermo, Kingdom of the Two Sicilies
- Died: 12 March 1897; Palermo, Italy
- Occupations: ship-owner and founder of the "Marcello Barbaro e Figli"

Marcello Barbaro (April 20, 1829 – March 12, 1897) was an Italian ship-owner and founder of the "Marcello Barbaro e Figli" transportation company, that in the 70s became Pietro Barbaro S.p.A.

== Biography ==
=== Early years ===
Marcello Barbaro was born in Palermo in 1829 the son of Pietro Barbaro, a descendant of a family of salt traders who later on became bakers, and Maria Bommarito. The third of six children, he spent his youth working in his father’s bakery.

Following the premature death of his father, due to cholera, at the age of 13 Marcello decided to leave Palermo as a cabin boy, leaving his mother behind to care for the family and began travelling from Genoa to Marseille.

=== The return to Palermo ===
Upon returning home in 1848, Barbaro married Caterina Cottone, a woman from a powerful family in Palermo, with whom he had eight children, and quickly took on a prominent role in Palermo’s mercantile society. In 1851 he became co-shipowner of "Ebe", a sailing ship built by the shipyard "Di Liberto” and based in Palermo, thanks to the rights of co-ownership of the late husband of his wife Caterina that had been transferred to him.

=== Beginnings of commercial activity ===
In those years Palermo was becoming an important commercial exchange hub with the East. Following the death of his children Giovanni and Grazia, and of his wife Caterina, Marcello decided to return to sailing and then a life at sea and moved to Genoa to get his captain's license. After becoming captain in January 1868, Barbaro took ownership of the brig "Silenzio" with which he undertook expeditions throughout Italy. On the brig worked his brother Peter, as well as his sons Pietro and Giuseppe, encouraged by their father to undertake expeditions respectively at the age of 13 and 12.

In June 1870, Marcello married Caterina Murè, a woman from a family of merchants. Two years after the marriage, having redeemed the entire property, he became the sole owner of “Ebe”. A few years later, on a journey back from Talamone, the ship sank with a load of coal near Ustica and Marcello was forced to purchase a new one: the "Nuovo Piemonte". In 1885 the "Marcello Barbaro e figli” (Marcello Barbaro & Sons) was founded, a company which operated in the processing and transport of coal to be used as fuel for industrial and domestic purposes, and which Marcello ceded to his brother Pietro in 1888.

Marcello Barbaro died of a sudden death in Palermo on March the 12 1897, at the age of 68.

== Fleet ==
Name	Port of Registry	Nationality	Classification Society	Year	Size
Ebe	Palermo	Italian	Registro Italiano Navale	1850	
Silenzio	Palermo	Italian	Registro italiano navale	1869	
Marcello Barbaro	Palermo	Italian	Registro italiano navale	1880	
Pietrino Barbaro	Palermo	Italian	Registro italiano navale	1886	29,9 x 8,18 m
Nuovo Piemonte	Genoa	Italian	Registro italiano navale	1888	
Concezione Immacolata	Palermo	Italian	Registro italiano navale	1906	38,5 x 8,9 m
