= Hydrocarbon exploration =

Attempts to locate oil and gas

Hydrocarbon exploration (or oil and gas exploration) is the search by petroleum geologists and geophysicists for hydrocarbon deposits, particularly petroleum and natural gas, in the Earth's crust using petroleum geology.

== Exploration methods ==
Visible surface features such as oil seeps, natural gas seeps, pockmarks (underwater craters caused by escaping gas) provide basic evidence of hydrocarbon generation (be it shallow or deep in the Earth). However, most exploration depends on highly sophisticated technology to detect and determine the extent of these deposits using exploration geophysics. Areas thought to contain hydrocarbons are initially subjected to a gravity survey, magnetic survey, passive seismic or regional seismic reflection surveys to detect large-scale features of the sub-surface geology. Features of interest (known as leads) are subjected to more detailed seismic surveys which work on the principle of the time it takes for reflected sound waves to travel through matter (rock) of varying densities and using the process of depth conversion to create a profile of the substructure. Finally, when a prospect has been identified and evaluated and passes the oil company's selection criteria, an exploration well is drilled in an attempt to conclusively determine the presence or absence of oil or gas. In offshore operations, the risk can be reduced by using electromagnetic survey methods (EM)

Oil exploration is an expensive, high-risk operation. Offshore and remote area exploration is generally only undertaken by very large corporations or national governments. Typical shallow shelf oil wells (e.g. North Sea) cost US$10 – 30 million, while deep water wells can cost up to US$100 million plus. Hundreds of smaller companies search for onshore hydrocarbon deposits worldwide, with some wells costing as little as US$100,000.

== Elements of a petroleum prospect ==
A petroleum prospect is a potential trap which geologists believe may contain hydrocarbons. A significant amount of geological, structural and seismic investigation and analysis must first be completed to define the potential hydrocarbon drill location from a lead to a prospect. Four geological factors have to be present for a prospect to work and if any of them fail neither oil nor gas will be present.

Source rock
When an organic-rich rock such as oil shale or coal is subjected to high pressure and temperature over an extended period of time, hydrocarbons are formed.
Migration
Migration is the movement of petroleum from the source rock to the reservoir. The hydrocarbons are expelled from source rock by three density-related mechanisms: the newly matured hydrocarbons are less dense than their precursors, which causes over-pressure; the hydrocarbons are lighter, and so migrate upwards due to buoyancy, and the fluids expand as further burial causes increased heating. Most hydrocarbons migrate to the surface as oil seeps, but some will get trapped.
Reservoir
The hydrocarbons are contained in a reservoir rock. This is commonly a porous sandstone or limestone. The oil collects in the pores within the rock although open fractures within non-porous rocks (e.g. fractured granite) may also store hydrocarbons. The reservoir must also be permeable so that the hydrocarbons will flow to surface during production.
Trap
The hydrocarbons are buoyant and have to be trapped within a structural (e.g. Anticline, fault block) or stratigraphic trap. The hydrocarbon trap has to be covered by an impermeable rock known as a seal or cap-rock in order to prevent hydrocarbons escaping to the surface.

== Exploration risk ==
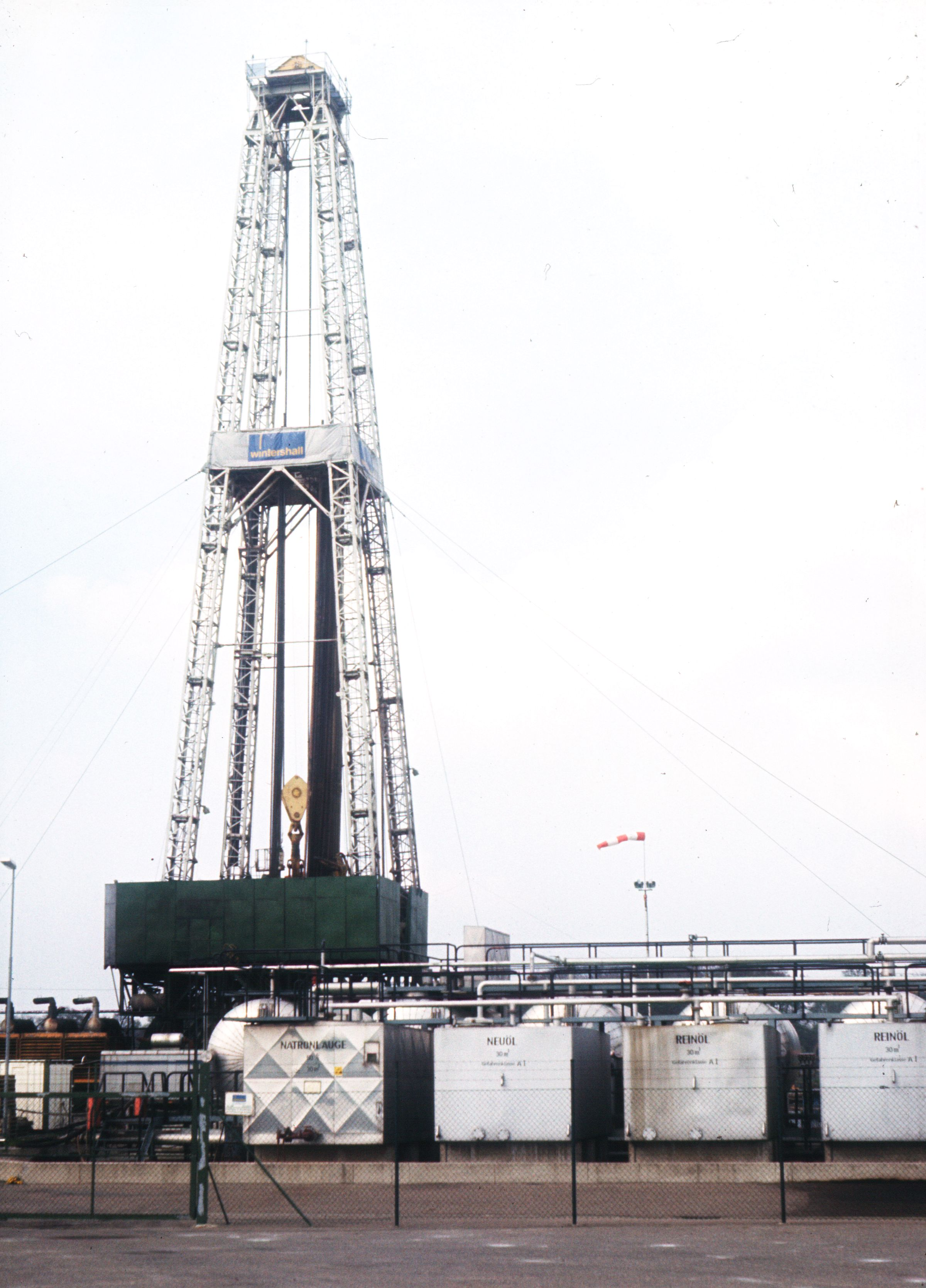
Onshore drilling rig

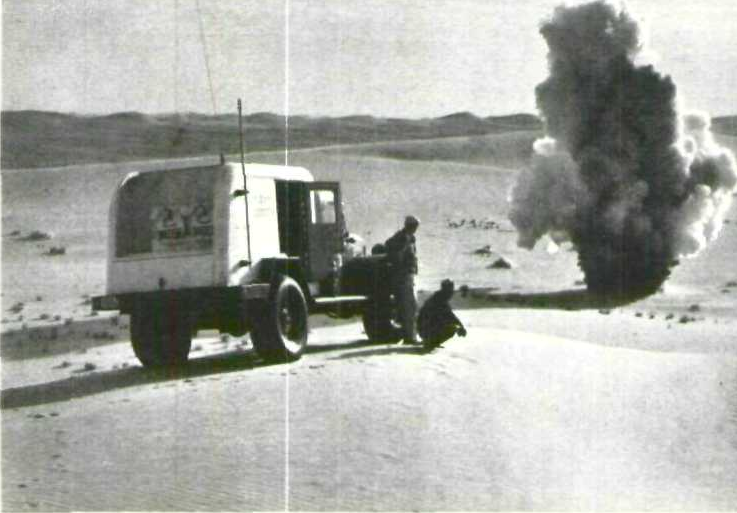
Seismic reflection survey being conducted in Saudi Arabia, c. 1960. A controlled explosion generates seismic waves that are detected by geophones.

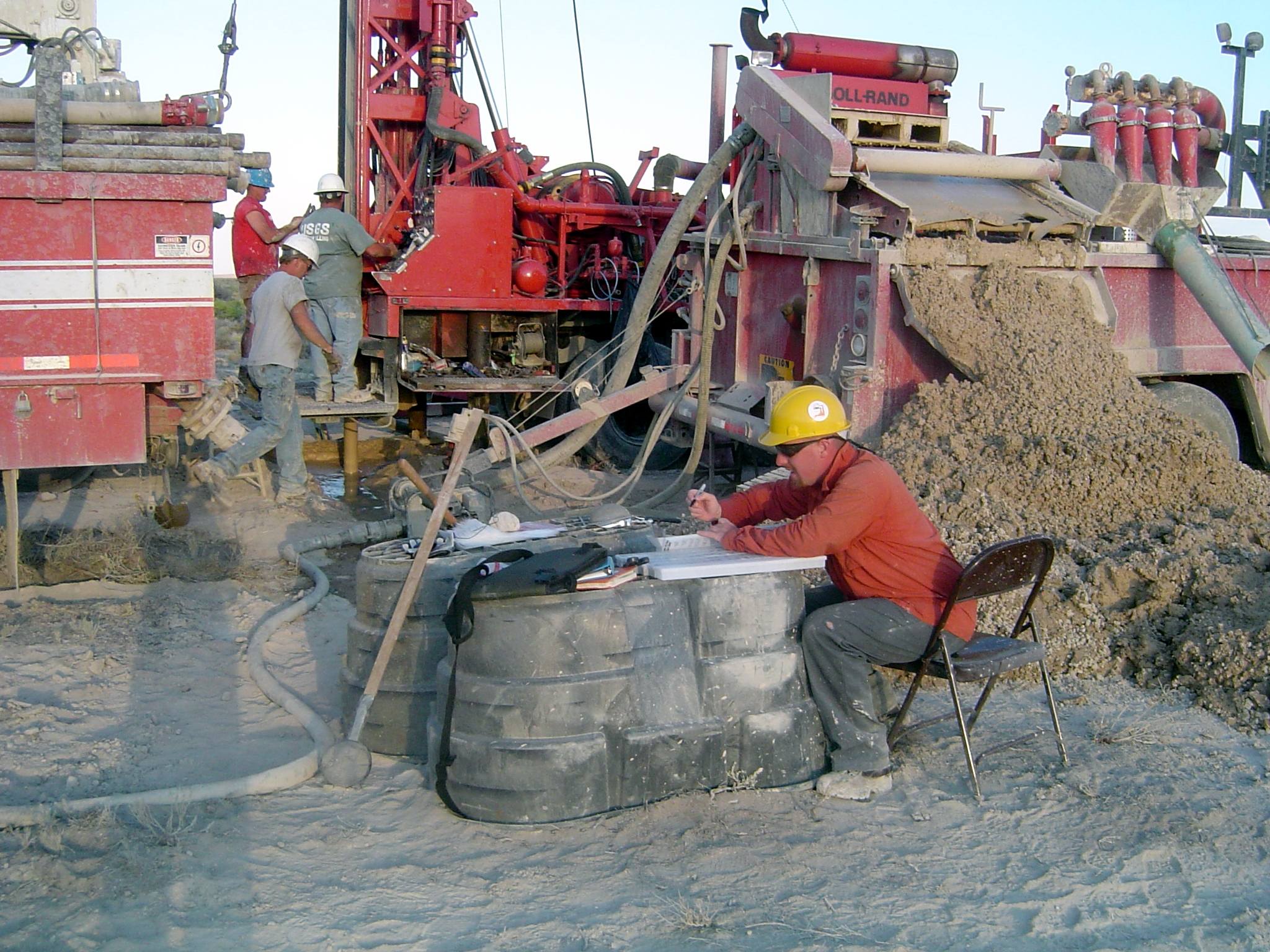
Mud log in process, a common way to study the rock types when drilling oil wells

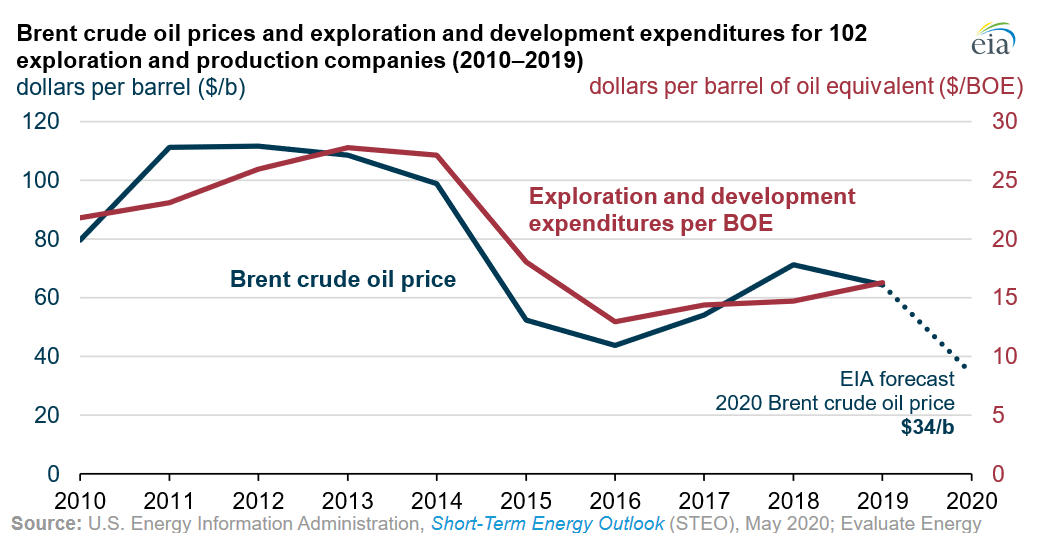
Oil exploration expenditures are greatest when crude oil prices are high.

Hydrocarbon exploration is a high risk investment and risk assessment is paramount for successful project portfolio management. Exploration risk is a difficult concept and is usually defined by assigning confidence to the presence of the imperative geological factors, as discussed above. This confidence is based on data and/or models and is usually mapped on Common Risk Segment Maps (CRS Maps). High confidence in the presence of imperative geological factors is usually coloured green and low confidence coloured red. Therefore, these maps are also called Traffic Light Maps, while the full procedure is often referred to as Play Fairway Analysis (PFA). The aim of such procedures is to force the geologist to objectively assess all different geological factors. Furthermore, it results in simple maps that can be understood by non-geologists and managers to base exploration decisions on.

== Terms used in petroleum evaluation ==
Bright spot
On a seismic section, coda that have high amplitudes due to a formation containing hydrocarbons.
Chance of success
An estimate of the chance of all the elements (see above) within a prospect working, described as a probability.
Dry hole
A boring that does not contain commercial hydrocarbons. See also Dry-hole clause
Flat spot
Possibly an oil-water, gas-water or gas-oil contact on a seismic section; flat due to gravity.
Full Waveform Inversion
A supercomputer technique recently use in conjunction with seismic sensors to explore for petroleum deposits offshore.
Hydrocarbon in place
Amount of hydrocarbon likely to be contained in the prospect. This is calculated using the volumetric equation - GRV x N/G x Porosity x Sh / FVF

Gross rock volume (GRV)
Amount of rock in the trap above the hydrocarbon water contact
Net sand
Part of GRV that has the lithological capacity for being a productive zone; i.e. less shale contaminations.
Net reserve
Part of net sand that has the minimum reservoir qualities; i.e. minimum porosity and permeability values.
Net/gross ratio (N/G)
Proportion of the GRV formed by the reservoir rock (range is 0 to 1)
Porosity
Percentage of the net reservoir rock occupied by pores (typically 5-35%)
Hydrocarbon saturation (Sh)
Some of the pore space is filled with water - this must be discounted
Formation volume factor (FVF)
Oil shrinks and gas expands when brought to the surface. The FVF converts volumes at reservoir conditions (high pressure and high temperature) to storage and sale conditions

Lead
Potential accumulation is currently poorly defined and requires more data acquisition and/or evaluation in order to be classified as a prospect.
Play
An area in which hydrocarbon accumulations or prospects of a given type occur. For example, the shale gas plays in North America include the Barnett, Eagle Ford, Fayetteville, Haynesville, Marcellus, and Woodford, among many others.
Prospect
A lead which has been more fully evaluated.
Recoverable hydrocarbons
Amount of hydrocarbon likely to be recovered during production. This is typically 10-50% in an oil field and 50-80% in a gas field.

== Licensing ==
Petroleum resources are typically owned by the government of the host country. In the United States, most onshore (land) oil and gas rights (OGM) are owned by private individuals, in which case oil companies must negotiate terms for a lease of these rights with the individual who owns the OGM. Sometimes this is not the same person who owns the land surface. In most nations the government issues licences to explore, develop and produce its oil and gas resources, which are typically administered by the oil ministry. There are several different types of licence. Oil companies often operate in joint ventures to spread the risk; one of the companies in the partnership is designated the operator who actually supervises the work.

Tax and Royalty
Companies would pay a royalty on any oil produced, together with a profits tax (which can have expenditure offset against it). In some cases there are also various bonuses and ground rents (license fees) payable to the government - for example a signature bonus payable at the start of the licence. Licences are awarded in competitive bid rounds on the basis of either the size of the work programme (number of wells, seismic etc.) or size of the signature bonus.
Production Sharing contract (PSA)
A PSA is more complex than a Tax/Royalty system - The companies bid on the percentage of the production that the host government receives (this may be variable with the oil price), There is often also participation by the Government owned National Oil Company (NOC). There are also various bonuses to be paid. Development expenditure is offset against production revenue.
Service contract
This is when an oil company acts as a contractor for the host government, being paid to produce the hydrocarbons.

== Reserves and resources ==
Resources are hydrocarbons which may or may not be produced in the future. A resource number may be assigned to an undrilled prospect or an unappraised discovery. Appraisal by drilling additional delineation wells or acquiring extra seismic data will confirm the size of the field and lead to project sanction. At this point the relevant government body gives the oil company a production licence which enables the field to be developed. This is also the point at which oil reserves and gas reserves can be formally booked.

=== Oil and gas reserves ===
Oil and gas reserves are defined as volumes that will be commercially recovered in the future. Reserves are separated into three categories: proved, probable, and possible. To be included in any reserves category, all commercial aspects must have been addressed, which includes government consent. Technical issues alone separate proved from unproved categories. All reserve estimates involve some degree of uncertainty.

- Proved reserves are the highest valued category. Proved reserves have a "reasonable certainty" of being recovered, which means a high degree of confidence that the volumes will be recovered. Some industry specialists refer to this as P90, i.e., having a 90% certainty of being produced. The SEC provides a more detailed definition:

Proved oil and gas reserves are those quantities of oil and gas, which, by analysis of geoscience and engineering data, can be estimated with reasonable certainty to be economically producible—from a given date forward, from known reservoirs, and under existing economic conditions, operating methods, and government regulations—prior to the time at which contracts providing the right to operate expire, unless evidence indicates that renewal is reasonably certain, regardless of whether deterministic or probabilistic methods are used for the estimation. The project to extract the hydrocarbons must have commenced or the operator must be reasonably certain that it will commence the project within a reasonable time.

- Probable reserves are volumes defined as "less likely to be recovered than proved, but more certain to be recovered than Possible Reserves". Some industry specialists refer to this as P50, i.e., having a 50% certainty of being produced.
- Possible reserves are reserves which analysis of geological and engineering data suggests are less likely to be recoverable than probable reserves. Some industry specialists refer to this as P10, i.e., having a 10% certainty of being produced.

The term 1P is frequently used to denote proved reserves; 2P is the sum of proved and probable reserves; and 3P the sum of proved, probable, and possible reserves. The best estimate of recovery from committed projects is generally considered to be the 2P sum of proved and probable reserves. Note that these volumes only refer to currently justified projects or those projects already in development.

=== Reserve booking ===
Oil and gas reserves are the main asset of an oil company. Booking is the process by which they are added to the balance sheet.

In the United States, booking is done according to a set of rules developed by the Society of Petroleum Engineers (SPE). The reserves of any company listed on the New York Stock Exchange have to be stated to the U.S. Securities and Exchange Commission. Reported reserves may be audited by outside geologists, although this is not a legal requirement.

In Russia, companies report their reserves to the State Commission on Mineral Reserves (GKZ).

== See also ==
- Abiogenic petroleum origin
- Decline curve analysis
- Drill baby drill
- Energy development
- Future energy development
- Giant oil and gas fields
- Hubbert peak
- List of petroleum industry occupations
- NORM
- Petroleum
- Petroleum exploration in the Arctic
- Petroleum licensing
- Renewable energy
- Seismic source
- Site survey
- Upward continuation
- Wildcatter
- Extraction of petroleum
