= Iron roughneck =

Pipe connector used in oil rigs

An iron roughneck is a piece of hydraulic machinery used to "handle" (connect and disconnect) segments of pipe in a modern drilling rig. The segments can be manipulated as they are hoisted into and out of a borehole. This type of work was previously performed manually by workers using tongs, and was one of the most dangerous jobs in a drilling operation. However, with iron roughnecks and modern technology, much of this can be done remotely with minimal manual handling.

Automated roughnecks became common in deep-water drilling and were later adopted by onshore rigs.
