= Petroleum production engineering =

Petroleum production engineering is a subset of petroleum engineering.

Petroleum production engineers design and select subsurface equipment to produce oil and gas well fluids. They often are degreed as petroleum engineers, although they may come from other technical disciplines (e.g., mechanical engineering, chemical engineering, physicist) and subsequently be trained by an oil and gas company.

== Overview ==
Petroleum production engineers' responsibilities include:

1. Evaluating inflow and outflow performance between the reservoir and the wellbore.
2. Designing completion systems, including tubing selection, perforating, sand control, matrix stimulation, and hydraulic fracturing.
3. Selecting artificial lift equipment, including sucker-rod lift (typically beam pumping), gas lift, electrical submersible pumps, subsurface hydraulic pumps, progressing-cavity pumps, and plunger lift.
4. Selecting ( not design ) equipment for surface facilities that separate and measure the produced fluids (oil, natural gas, water, and impurities), prepare the oil and gas for transportation to market, and handle disposal of any water and impurities.

Note: Surface equipments are designed by Chemical engineers and Mechanical engineers according to data provided by the production engineers.

== Suggested reading ==
- Journal of Petroleum Technology, Society of Petroleum Engineers

Outflow should be defined as flow from the casing perforations to the surface facilities.
