= Petroleum transport =

Transportation of petroleum and derivative products

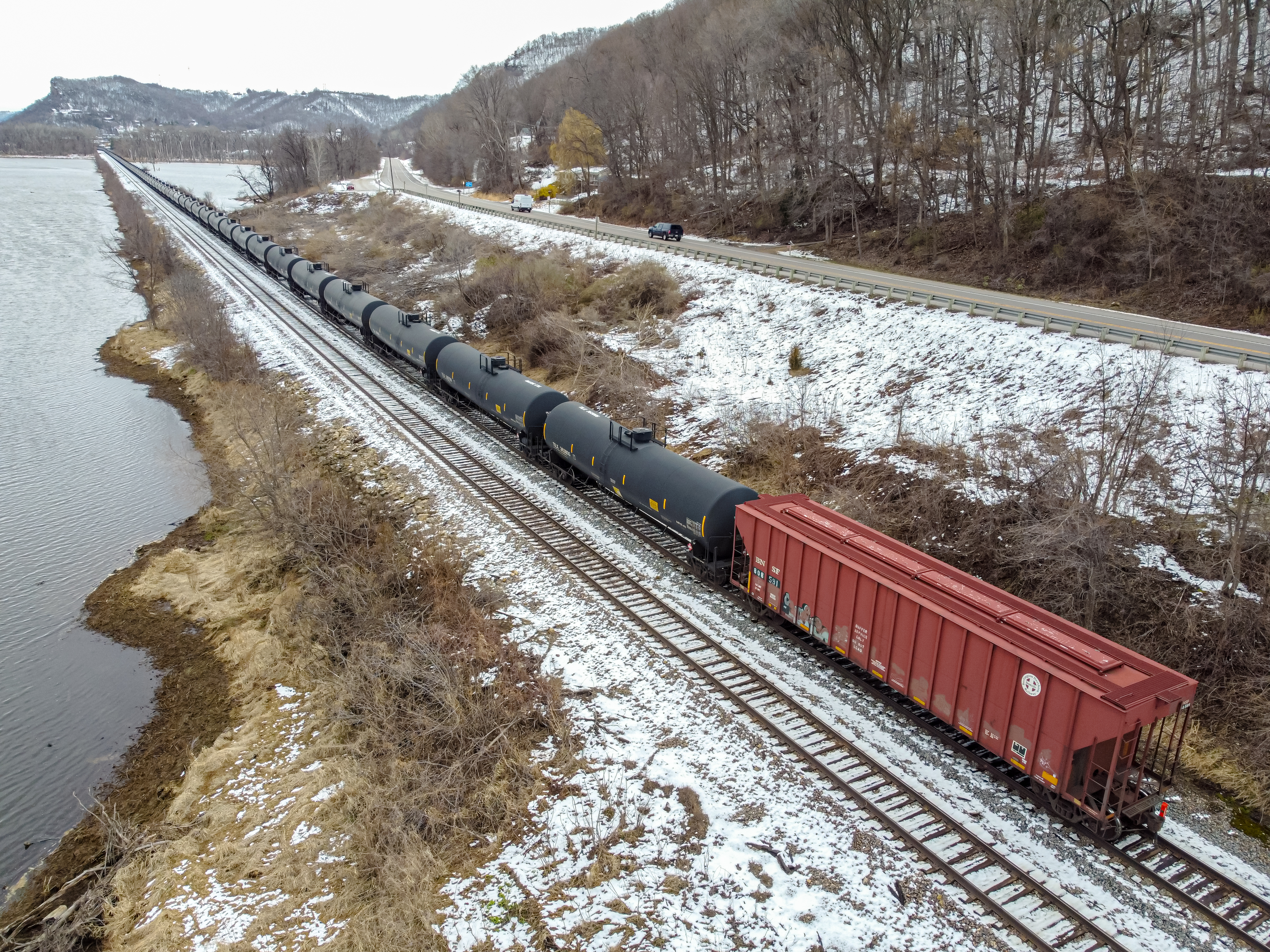
Oil train near La Crosse, Wisconsin

Petroleum transport is the transportation of petroleum and derivatives such as gasoline (petrol). Petroleum products are transported via rail cars, trucks, tanker vessels, and pipeline networks. The method used to move the petroleum products depends on the volume that is being moved and its destination. Land-based transportation modes such as pipelines and rail each have strengths and weaknesses. One of the key differences is the cost associated with transporting petroleum though pipeline or rail. The risks with moving petroleum products are pollution related and the chance of spillage. Petroleum oil is very hard to clean up and is very toxic to living animals and their surroundings.

== Methods ==
=== Marine Vessels ===
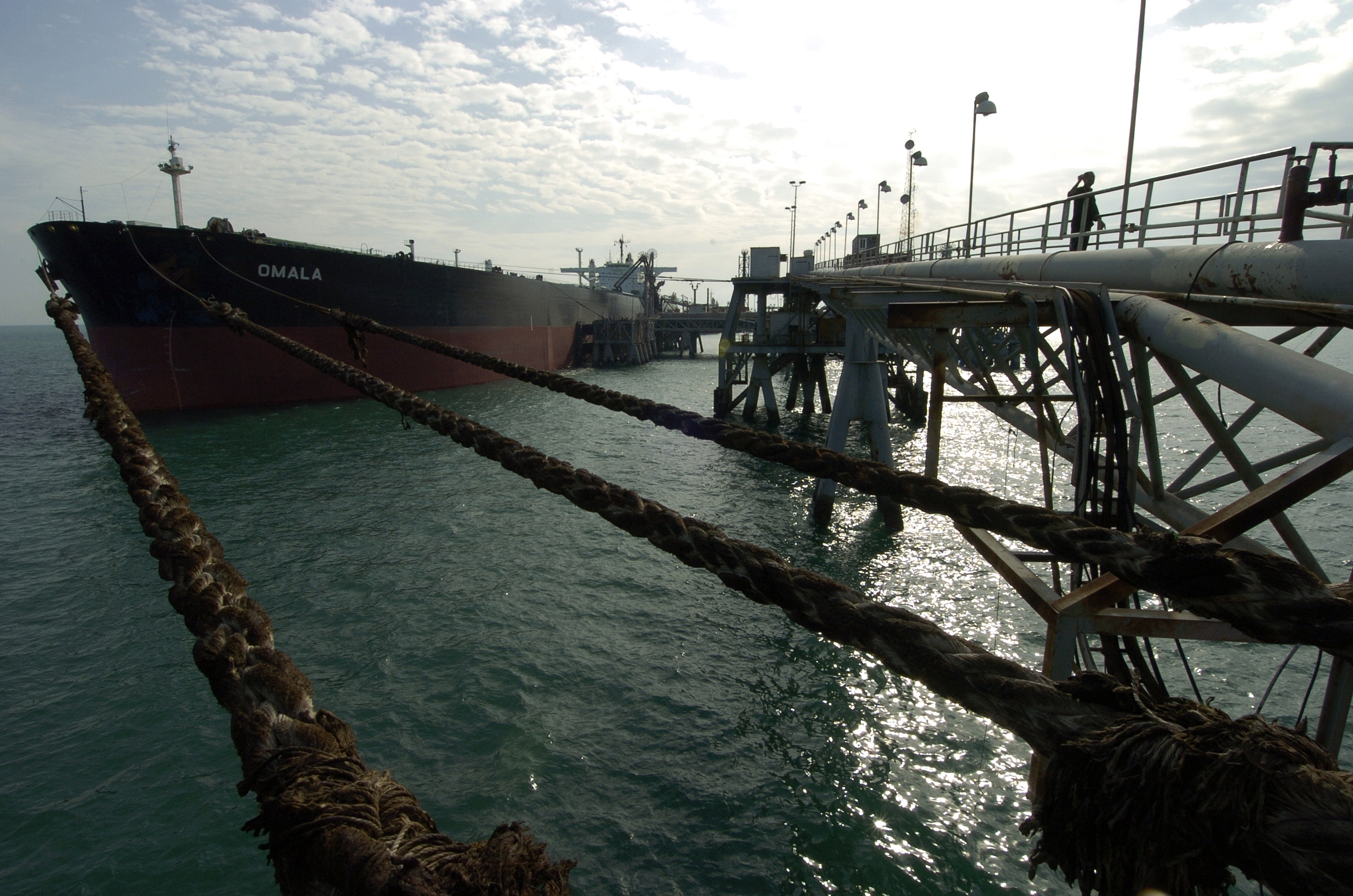
Oil tanker filling at the Al Başrah Oil Terminal in Iraq

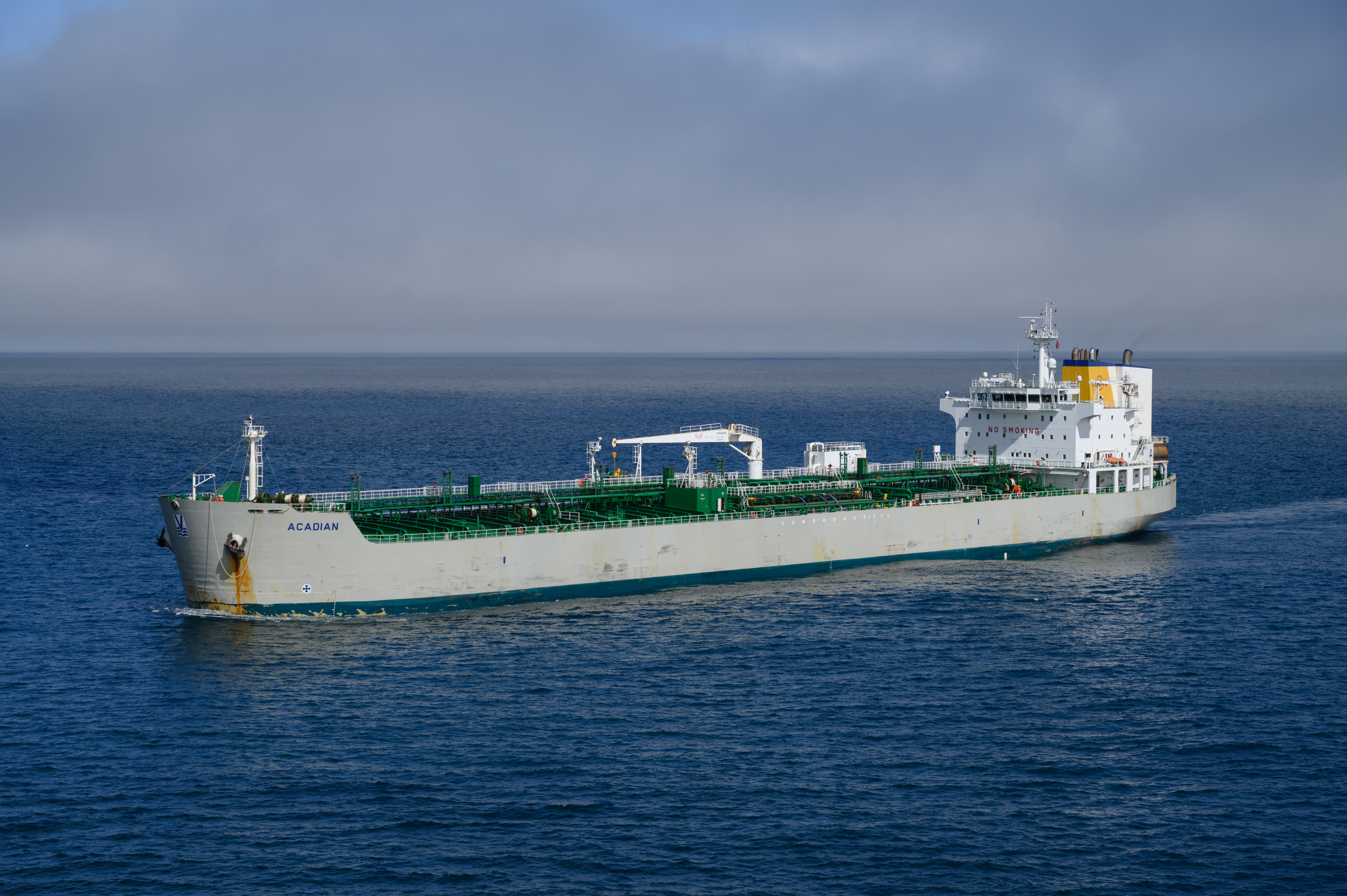
Oil products tanker, Acadian, arriving at St. John's Harbor, Newfoundland, Canada

Marine Vessels and barges can transport this petroleum all around the world. Because these vessels can carry a lot of fuel, the amount it costs per barrel is comparatively very cheap. These tankers are also the only practical way to move crude oil across the oceans. Usually the larger tankers are used to transport fuel on a global scale, taking fuel from one continent to the other. Barges are more like tankers, but smaller and do not have any method of propulsion to move them. They are often pushed or towed by tugs. This makes barges very ineffective for transporting oil over long distances. Barges are also not applicable for traveling across rough seas, so they are used in calmer waters. However, these barges are usually used for transporting fuel shorter distances.

=== Pipelines ===
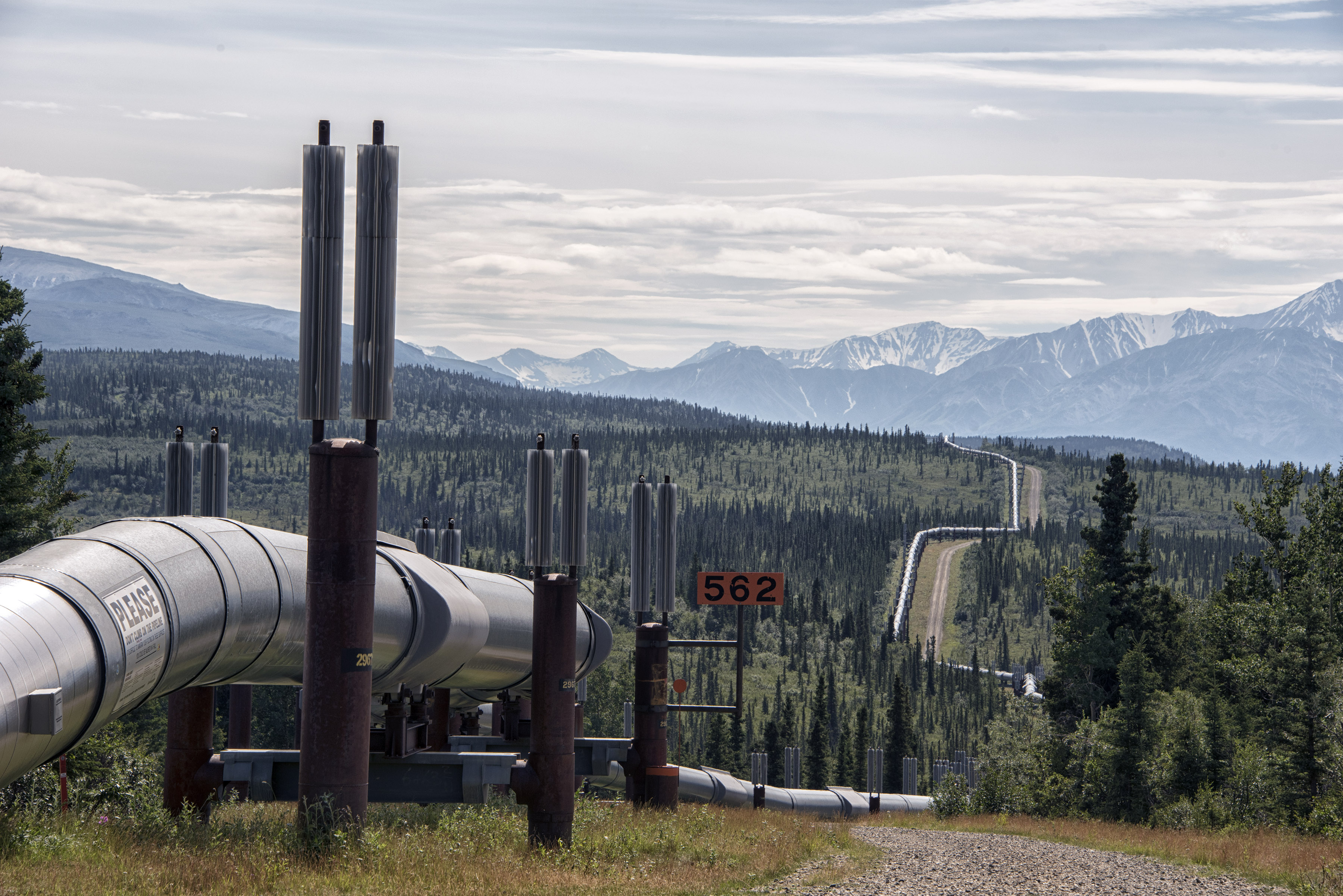
The Trans-Alaska Pipeline System cuts through Alaska's wilderness. Special heat exchanger supports protect the Permafrost from melting

Pipelines are used to transport oil from wells to refineries and storage facilities, and are viewed as the most cost efficient way to move oil on land. Pipelines have also been found to be the safest mode of transport for oil, with one study finding an incidence rate of just 0.58 incidents per billion-ton miles. In Canada, over 99.99 percent of the oil transported by federally regulated pipeline arrives safely every year. First, the oil is collected at the wellhead, or some area where the oil is stored. From the wellhead it is pumped across the land through a pipe, and is discharged at its destination which typically is a refinery. However, pipelines can be used the same way to deliver already refined fuels such as gasoline, diesel and even jet fuel from the refinery to distribution facilities or a consumer. These pipelines are not just a solid line of straight pipe, but have various components on the pipeline. These pipelines will have booster pumps to keep the fuel moving along a long distance, inspection areas to make sure that the fuel is not getting any contaminants, and even other collection and delivery points along the way. Although it costs a lot of money and time to set up these pipelines, the operation cost is significantly less than using any other type of transportation. Also, the amount of manpower needed to move this oil is not that much. Pipelines offer the most efficient mode of transporting this oil across a land mass. Even though these pipes are extremely cost effective there are some circumstances where this is not true and it is more logical to use another method. An example of this is how it is cheaper and more logical to use a ship to move the oil across the Atlantic Ocean than a pipeline.

=== Trains ===
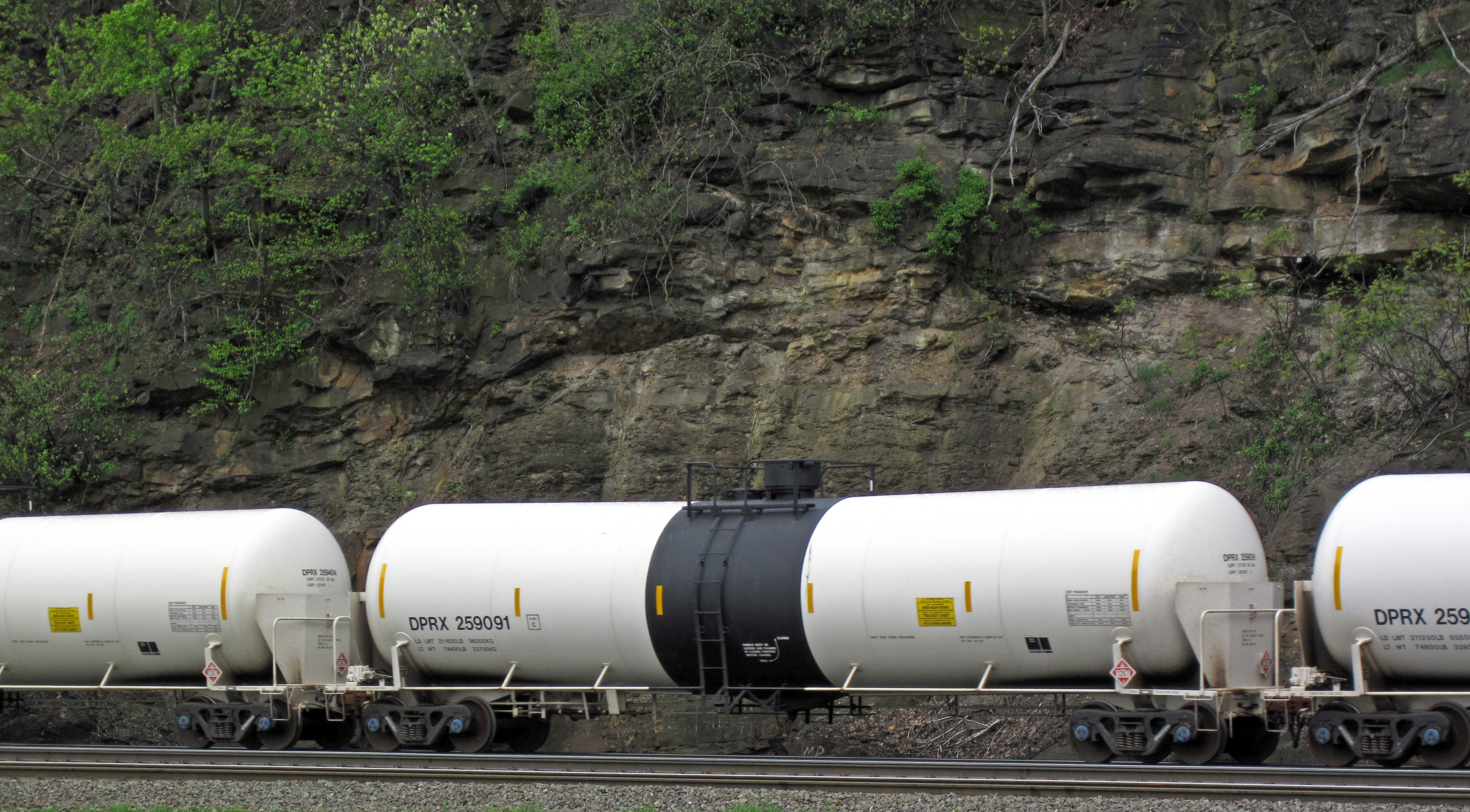
Tanker cars marked UN number 1267 - Crude Oil, cross Altoona, Pennsylvania to a refinery

Tank cars are another way to move crude oil across a landmass. The oil is loaded into the tank cars, and are moved by a diesel train across the rails to the refinery or the train’s planned destination. Trains can carry a massive amount of this oil by using multiple tank cars. Though each rail car holds a lot less oil than a large marine tanker vessel, when multiple are used a lot of oil can be transported. For example, the DOT-111 tank car is a very common tank car and can hold 131 cubic metres (820 bbl; 35,000 US gal). If ten tank cars were pulled the train would be carrying 1,310 cubic metres (8,200 bbl; 350,000 US gal) of oil, so the amount of volume increases rapidly. The locomotive used to pull these rail cars have a massive amount of horsepower and can be hooked up with other locomotives to increase the power, making the rail car a fairly cost effective way to move this oil. These rail cars, just like the pipelines, can be used to carry a refined fuel instead of crude oil from a refinery to a distributing plant. Rail cars are a common way to move this fuel a long distance to areas where they do not have pipelines set up.

==== Pipeline versus rail debate ====
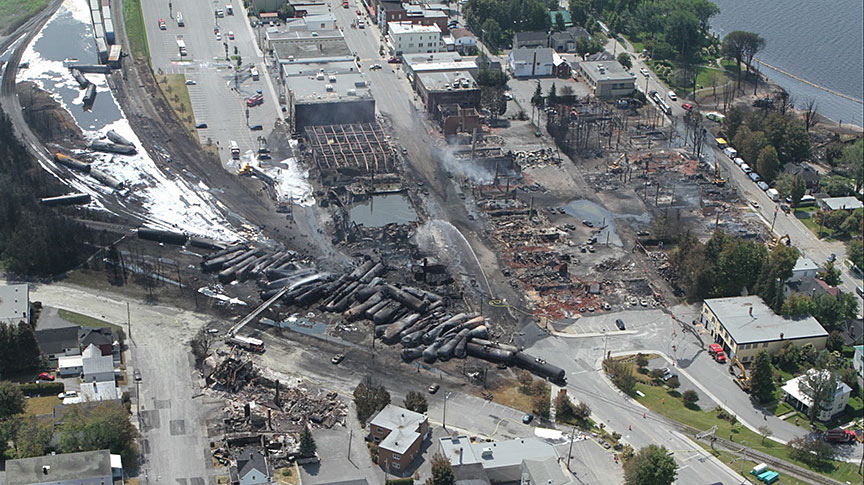
The Lac-Mégantic rail disaster, in which over 30 buildings were destroyed and 47 killed, after a runaway train derailed at high speed

The public debate surrounding the trade-offs between pipeline and rail transportation has been developing over the past decade as the amount of crude oil transported by rail has increased. It was invigorated in 2013 after the deadly Lac-Mégantic disaster in Quebec when a freight train derailed and spilled 5.56 million litres of crude oil, which resulted in explosions and fires that destroyed much of the town's core. That same year, a train carrying propane and crude derailed near Gainford, Alberta, resulting in two explosions but no injuries or fatalities. These rail accidents, among other examples, have raised concerns that the regulation of rail transport is inadequate for large-scale crude oil shipments. Pipeline failures also occur, for instance, in 2015 a Nexen pipeline ruptured and leaked 5 million litres of crude oil over approximately 16,000 m^{2} at the company's Long Lake oilsands facility south of Fort McMurray. Although both pipeline and rail transportation are generally quite safe, neither mode is without risk. Numerous studies, however, indicate that pipelines are safer, based on the number of occurrences (accidents and incidents) weighed against the quantity of product transported. Between 2004 and 2015, the likelihood of rail accidents in Canada was 2.6 times greater than for pipelines per transported volume of oil equivalents. Natural gas products were 4.8 times more likely to have a rail occurrence when compared to similar commodities transported by pipelines. Critics question if pipelines carrying diluted bitumen from Alberta's oil sands are more likely to corrode and cause incidents, but evidence shows the risk of corrosion being no different than that of other crude oils.

=== Trucks ===
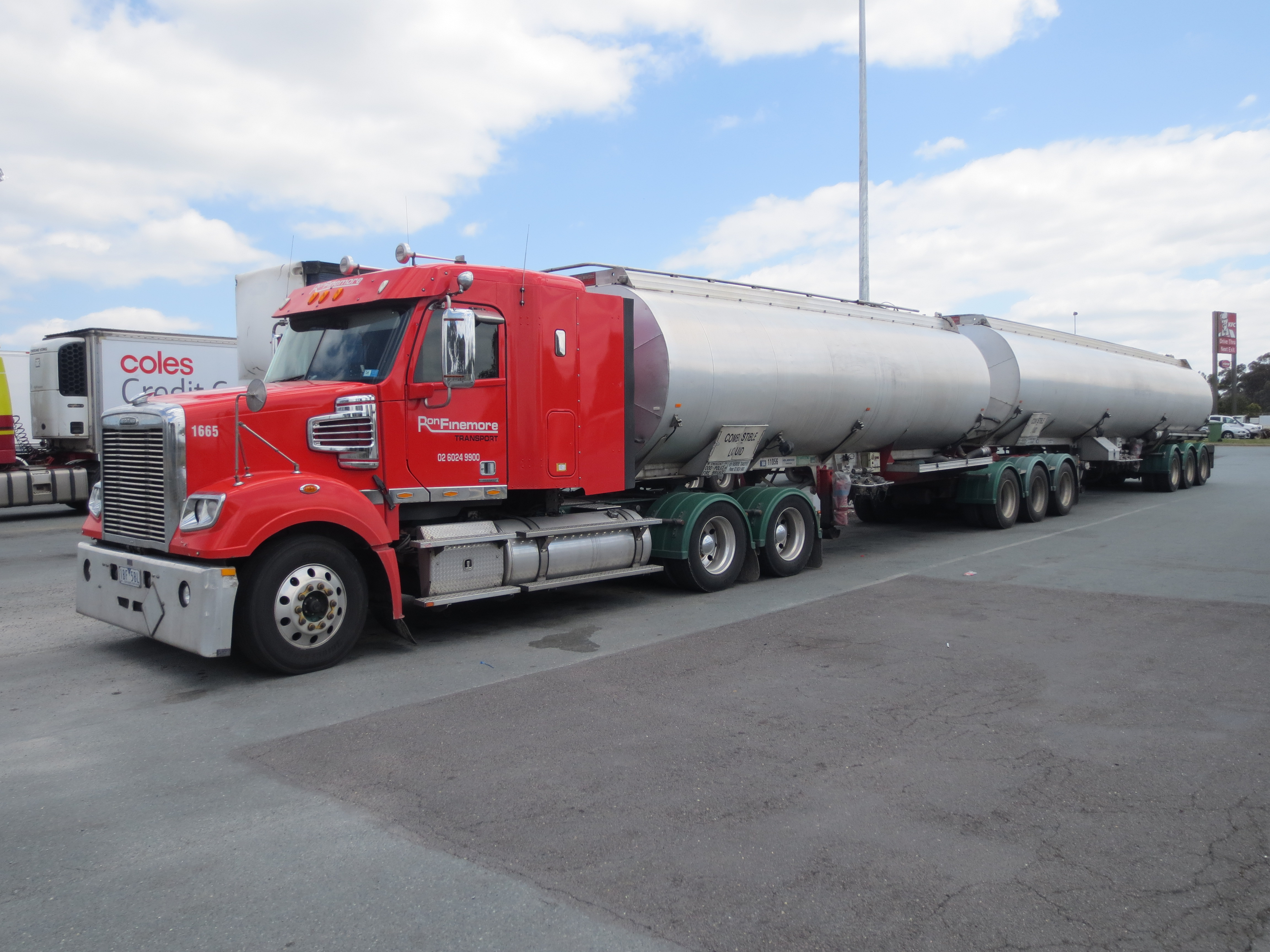
A double tank truck in Australia

Tank trucks are used more like rail cars are, but they will usually transport refined fuel to a fuel station, like a gas station. Trucks typically carry smaller volumes over shorter distances. Like rail cars, these trucks can carry several different forms of this petroleum (crude oil from oilfields to refineries, refined petroleum to gas stations or direct to consumers) when no other means of transport such as pipeline or rail is available. Common sizes of their tanks range from 1.5 to 28.4 cubic metres (400 to 7,500 US gal).

== Pollution concerns ==
Every method of transporting petroleum has the potential for a major oil spill. However, the amount of oil spilled while it is in transport is a small percentage of the total oil spilled. Most oil is spilled during loading and unloading and industrial plants accidentally spilling the oil into the ground. Regulations are created to help mitigate such oil spills. Some of these regulations include forcing marine tankers to have double hulls, and making a minimum of two man crew on trains that are carrying crude oil. Even though the least amount of oil spills happens when the oil is in transit, regulations are still put in. If the oil is spilled while it is in a ship, tank truck, pipeline or rail car, it can result in fire, poisoning of plants, injuries and fatalities of the crew and citizens. There are also regulations put in place to prevent the spilling of oil and petroleum vapors while loading and unloading these fuels as well as processing the oil. The goal of these regulations is to make sure that all oil delivered or processed equals the amount of oil received. A simple example of this is the vapor guard on the nozzle of the gas pump at the gas stations. These regulations make sure that the companies watch to see that they do not have leaks in any pipes or equipment. When the oil is being processed is when it has a great potential of being leaked, so constant watch is required. These regulations are constantly changing as more discoveries on how to better control oil spills are being found.

=== Costs: pipeline vs rail ===
A 2017 study by the National Bureau of Economic Research found that contrary to popular belief, the sum of air pollution and greenhouse gas emissions costs is substantially larger than accidents and spill costs for both pipelines and rail. For crude oil transported from the North Dakota Bakken Formation, air pollution and greenhouse gas emission costs are substantially larger for rail compared to pipeline. For pipelines and rail, the Pipeline and Hazardous Materials Safety Administration's (PHMSA) central estimate of spill and accident costs is US$62 and US$381 per million-barrel miles transported, respectively. Total greenhouse gas and air pollution costs are 8 times higher than accident and spills costs for pipelines (US$531 vs US$62) and 3 times higher for rail (US$1015 vs US$381).

Finally, transporting oil and gas by rail is generally more expensive for producers than transporting it by pipeline. On average, it costs between US$10-$15 per barrel to transport oil and gas by rail compared to $5 a barrel for pipeline. In 2012,16 million barrels of oil were imported to USA by rail. By 2014, that number increased to 59 million barrels. Although quantities decreased to 48 million barrels in 2017, the competitive advantages offered by rail, particularly its access to remote regions as well as lack of regulatory and social challenges compared with building new pipelines, will likely make it a viable transportation method for years to come. Both forms of transportation play a role in moving oil efficiently, but each has its unique trade-offs in terms of the benefits it offers.

== See also ==
- List of petroleum industry occupations
