= Upward continuation =

Method used in oil exploration and geophysics

Upward continuation is a method used in oil exploration and geophysics to estimate the values of a gravitational or magnetic field by using measurements at a lower elevation and extrapolating upward, assuming continuity. This technique is commonly used to merge different measurements to a common level so as to reduce scatter and allow for easier analysis.

== See also ==
- Petroleum geology
