= Dry-hole clause =

A dry-hole clause is a provision in an oil or Natural gas lease specifying what a lessee must do to maintain the lease for the remainder of a primary term after drilling a "dry hole." This term arises because those entering such an agreement must pay even if the project turns out to be a dry hole, producing nothing. Usually, the lessee will just have to pay delay rentals.

== Overview ==
A dry-hole clause is a provision in a contract that is used to allocate the risks and costs associated with drilling for oil or natural gas in the event that the drilling does not result in the discovery of a viable resource.

In the oil and gas industry, exploration and production activities can be extremely expensive, and there is always the risk that a well will not produce the expected results. A dry-hole clause is used to specify how the costs of drilling a dry hole (a well that does not produce a viable resource) will be shared between the parties involved in the project.

Dry-hole clauses have also been used in other forms of utility agreements such as electricity, such as the construction of nuclear power plants in the state of Washington in 1974, which was the subject of a court case determining whether Washington municipalities and planned unit developments have authority to enter into contracts with the risk of dry holes.

The specific terms of a dry-hole clause will depend on the specific circumstances of the project and the agreements that have been made between the parties involved.

== Leading cases ==
- Superior Oil Co. v. Stanolind Oil & Gas Co., 150 Tex. 317, 240 S.W.2d 281 (1951)
- Murphy v. Garfield Oil Co., 98 Okla. 273, 225 P. 676 (1923)

== See also ==
- United States energy law
