= Company man =

Term for employee of large corporation

Company man is a term for the loyal employee of a large corporation that was in use from the early 19th century to the late 20th century. It was often used to describe an individual who had worked for the same company for their entire career, and whose identity was thus closely tied to their employer. In the context of corporate United States, the term was used to describe an implicit social contract that emerged in the 1950s, between a middle-class worker who was willing to sacrifice some measure of autonomy in return for a steady salary from their employer, along with benefits, bonuses, promotions, and a secure retirement.

== See also ==
- Salaryman
