= Roustabout =

Worker with broad-based, non-specific skills

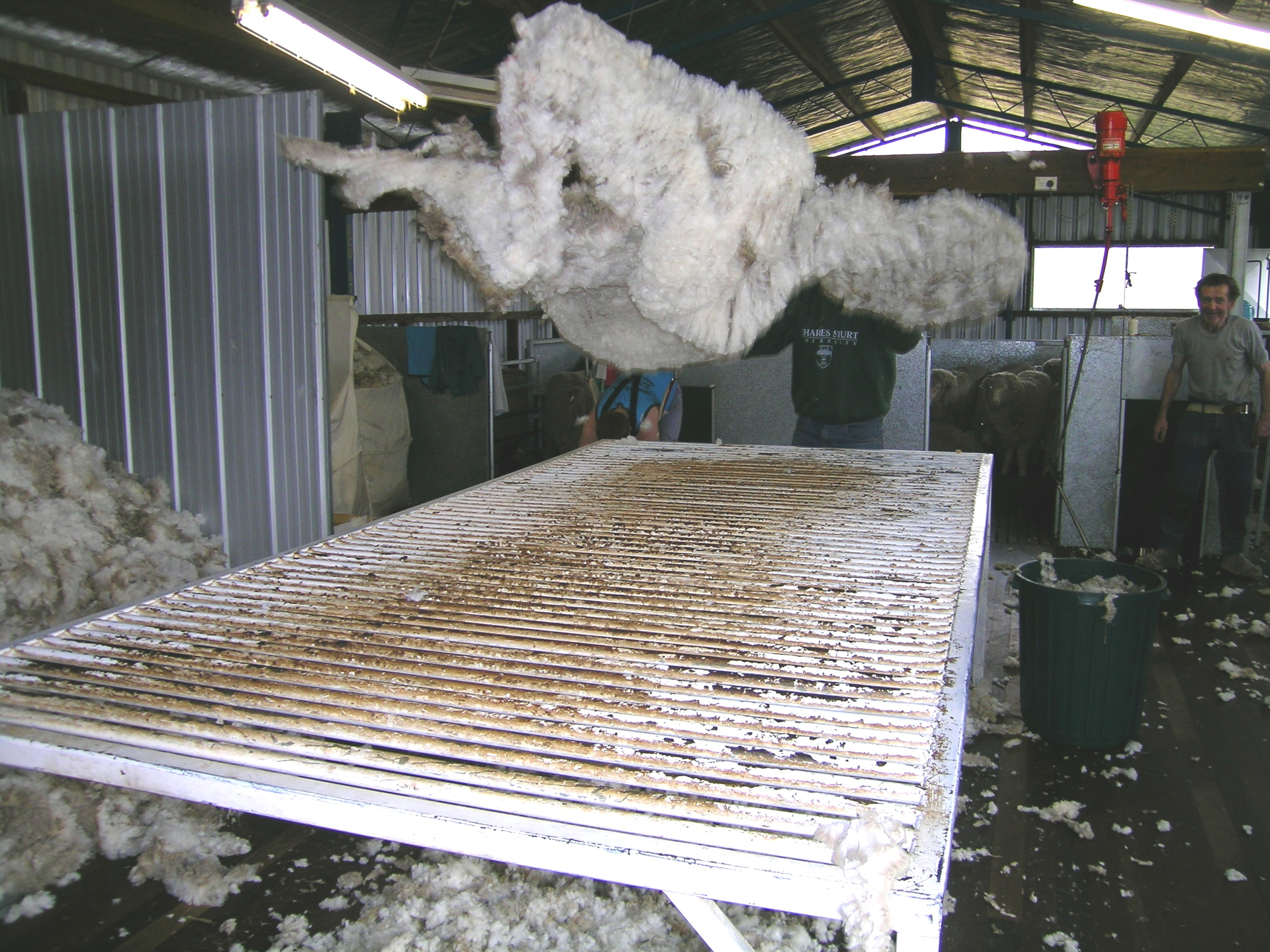
A roustabout throwing a freshly shorn fleece onto a wool table for skirting and classing.

Roustabouts unloading cotton from steamboat ca. 1900.

Roustabout (Australia/New Zealand English: rouseabout) is an occupational term. Traditionally, it referred to a worker with broad-based, non-specific skills. In particular, it was used to describe show or circus workers who put up tents and booths on fairgrounds. In modern times it is applied to rural employment, such as those assisting sheep shearing, and oil field work.

== Oil industry in the U.S. ==
Oil roustabout refers to a worker who maintains all things in the oil field. Roustabouts is an official classification of natural gas and oil rig personnel. Roustabouts working in oil fields typically perform various jobs requiring little training. Drillers start off as roustabouts until they gain enough hands-on experience to move up to a roughneck or floorhand position, then to driller and rig supervisor. Roustabouts will set up oil well heads, maintain saltwater disposal pumps, lease roads, lease mowing, create dikes around tank batteries on a lease, etc. An oil roustabout has no limits in the oil industry and can, and will do any and all oil field work, including roughneck drilling, oil well completion and well service, and even chemical work. An oil field roustabout will also do all things that an oil field pumper would have to do. However, they frequently turn out to be long-term employees and take on more difficult and sometimes dangerous jobs as they gain experience. Most go on to at least become “roughnecks” if they work for the rig company for more than a few months.

An early 2010 survey by Careercast.com of the best and worst jobs based on five criteria—environment, income, employment outlook, physical demands and stress—rated 'roustabout' as the worst job. Nonetheless, the anecdotal and subjective experience of an actual roustabout suggests that for some, it can be a challenging, adventurous job.

== Australia and New Zealand ==
In Australia and New Zealand a "rouseabout" can be any worker with broad-based, non-specific skills, in any industry. However, rouseabouts or "rousies" most commonly work in rural employment, especially sheep farming, as in the film The Sundowners, where they leave town before the sun goes down.

== In popular culture ==
The term was used in Disney's 1941 animated film Dumbo, during a musical scene in which depicted a group of African-American laborers pulling circus materials off the train for construction.

Roustabout was a 1964 musical movie starring Elvis Presley, Barbara Stanwyck, and Joan Freeman, in a story set in a traveling carnival — for which Presley recorded the song titled "Roustabout".

Farley Granger's character, Arthur "Bowie" Bowers, in Nicholas Ray's 1948 film noir They Live By Night, tells Catherine "Keeetchie" Mobley (Cathy O'Donnell) that he was a roustabout with a circus.

The term is used in the song "The Mariner's Revenge Song", by The Decemberists.

The term is also used by Beats Antique for two songs on their album Collide.

The Slamball team Rousties is named after a roustabout.

Roughnecks and Roustabouts is the second album by Pete Williams, formerly bassist and vocalist with Dexys Midnight Runners, and currently performing as The Pete Williams Band.

== See also ==
- Roughneck
