= Society of Petroleum Engineers =

Not-for-profit professional organization

- Founded: October 6, 1957
- Type: Professional organization
- Headquarters: Houston, Texas, USA
- Origins: The Petroleum Division of the AIME
- Region served: Worldwide
- Method: Conferences, publications, training
- Members: 129,900
- Key people: Simon Seaton (CEO/Executive Vice President) Jennifer Miskimins (2026 President); Olivier Houzé (2025 President); Terry Palisch (2024 President); Med Kamal (2023 President); Kamel Ben Naceur (2022 President) Mark Rubin (former CEO, ret. July 2023)
- Employees: 270
- Website: www.spe.org

The Society of Petroleum Engineers (SPE) is a 501(c)(3) not-for-profit professional organization.

SPE provides a worldwide forum for oil and natural gas exploration and production (E&P) professionals to exchange technical knowledge and best practices. SPE manages OnePetro and PetroWiki, in addition to publishing magazines, peer-reviewed journals, and books. SPE also hosts more than 100 events each year across the globe as well as providing online tools and in-person training opportunities. SPE's technical library (OnePetro) contains more than 314,000 technical papers—products of SPE conferences and periodicals, made available to the entire industry.

SPE has offices in Dallas, Houston, Calgary, Dubai and Kuala Lumpur. SPE is a professional association for more than 129,000 engineers, scientists, managers, and educators. There are about 66,000 student members of SPE.

== History ==
The history of the SPE began well before its actual establishment. During the decade after the 1901 discovery of the Spindletop field, the American Institute of Mining Engineers (AIME) saw a growing need for a forum in the booming new field of petroleum engineering. As a result, AIME formed a standing committee on oil and gas in 1913.

In 1922, the committee was expanded to become one of AIME's 10 professional divisions. The Petroleum Division of AIME continued to grow throughout the next three decades. By 1950, the Petroleum Division had become one of three separate branches of AIME, and in 1957 the Petroleum Branch of AIME was expanded once again to form a professional society.

SPE became tax-exempt in March 1985.

The first SPE Board of Directors meeting was held 6 October 1957. SPE continues to operate more than 100 events around the world.

== Membership ==
SPE is a non-profit association for petroleum engineers. Petroleum engineers who become members of SPE gain access to several member benefits like a complimentary subscription to the Journal of Petroleum Technology, unlimited free webinars, and discounts on SPE events (conferences, workshops, training courses, etc.) and publications. SPE Connect is a site and app for SPE members to exchange technical knowledge, discuss and answer practical application questions, and share best practices.

SPE is made up of 129,900 members in 148 countries. SPE Sections are groups of SPE Professional Members, and SPE Student Chapters are groups of SPE Student Members typically named for the hosting university or a geographical region. 63,000+ professional members are affiliated with 195 SPE Sections, and 66,000+ student members are affiliated with the 428 SPE Student Chapters.

SPE annually grants scholarships to student members.

=== Awards ===
Annually, SPE recognizes individuals for their contribution to the oil and gas industry at the regional and international levels.

All individuals who receive SPE Awards were nominated by either an industry colleague, mentor, etc., except for recipients of the Cedric K. Ferguson Young Technical Author Medal, which is awarded to SPE members who author a paper approved for publication in an SPE journal (peer-reviewed journals on oil and gas topics) before age 36. Eligibility for the awards is denoted online.

SPE International Awards are announced online, featured in the Journal of Petroleum Technology, and presented at the Annual Technical Conference and Exhibition.

==== Regional awards ====
SPE grants technical and professional awards at the regional level. To be considered for these awards, one must be nominated online. Regional technical award eligibility is described online. Regional awards are presented at regional or section meetings.

=== Distinguished Lecturers ===
The SPE Distinguished Lecturer Committee (DL) each year selects a group of nominees to become SPE Distinguished Lecturers. SPE Distinguished Lecturers are nominated for the program and selected by the committee to share their industry expertise by lecturing at local SPE sections across the globe. Nominees are notified of their nomination and must submit a summary of their biography, a presentation that can be given in thirty minutes or less, and additional information for the DL committee. The schedule of DL talks is available online. Some DL talks are very popular and are made available online as webinars.

== Publications ==
SPE publishes peer-reviewed journals, magazines, and books. Technical papers presented at SPE conferences or approved for publication in SPE peer-reviewed journals are also published to OnePetro.org.

=== Peer-reviewed Journal ===
SPE Journal, a leading publication in oil, petroleum, and natural gas, offers peer-reviewed papers showcasing methods and technology solutions by industry experts. Its first issue was published in 1996.

=== Magazines ===
SPE publishes two online magazines:

- Journal of Petroleum Technology (JPT) is the SPE flagship magazine, providing articles on oil & gas technology advancements, issues, and other exploration and production industry news. The JPT newsletter is sent out weekly on Wednesdays. Anyone may sign up to receive the JPT newsletter, though some content is only accessible to members of SPE. Every SPE member receives a complimentary subscription to JPT.
- The Way Ahead (TWA) is by and for young professional members of SPE. It was first published in 2006 and moved from print to online in 2016.

== OnePetro ==
Launched in March 2007, OnePetro.org is a multi-society library that allows users to search for and access a broad range of technical literature related to the oil and gas exploration and production industry. OnePetro is a multi-association effort that reflects participation of many organizations. The Society of Petroleum Engineers (SPE) operates OnePetro on behalf of the participating organizations.

OnePetro currently contains more than 1.4 million searchable documents from 24 publishing partners. OnePetro users viewed 4.9 million items in 2023. OnePetro is the first online offering of documents from some organizations, making these materials widely available for the first time.

== SPE Petroleum Engineering Certification ==
The SPE Petroleum Engineering Certification program was instituted as a way to certify petroleum engineers by examination and experience. This certification is similar to the Registration of Petroleum Engineers by state in the United States.

Certified professionals use "SPEC" after their name.

== See also ==
- Energy law
