= Reservoir modeling =

Computer modelling of a petroleum reservoir

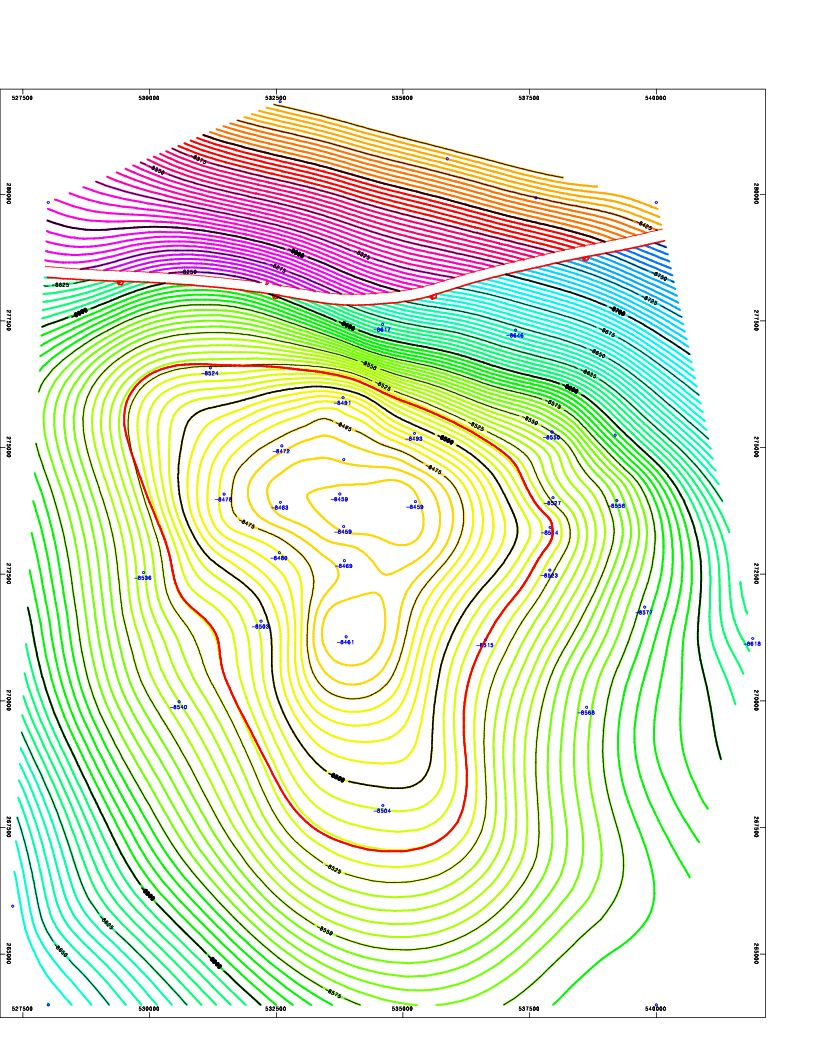
Screenshot of a structure map generated by Contour map software for an 8500ft deep gas & Oil reservoir in the Erath field, Vermilion Parish, Erath, Louisiana. The left-to-right gap, near the top of the contour map indicates a Fault line. This fault line is between the blue/green contour lines and the purple/red/yellow contour lines. The thin red circular contour line in the middle of the map indicates the top of the oil reservoir. Because gas floats above oil, the thin red contour line marks the gas/oil contact zone.

In the oil and gas industry, reservoir modeling involves the construction of a computer model of a petroleum reservoir, for the purposes of improving estimation of reserves and making decisions regarding the development of the field, predicting future production, placing additional wells and evaluating alternative reservoir management scenarios.

A reservoir model represents the physical space of the reservoir by an array of discrete cells, delineated by a grid which may be regular or irregular. The array of cells is usually three-dimensional, although 1D and 2D models are sometimes used. Values for attributes such as porosity, permeability and water saturation are associated with each cell. The value of each attribute is implicitly deemed to apply uniformly throughout the volume of the reservoir represented by the cell.

== Types of reservoir model ==
Reservoir models typically fall into two categories:

- Geological models are created by geologists and geophysicists and aim to provide a static description of the reservoir, prior to production.
- Reservoir simulation models are created by reservoir engineers and use finite difference methods to simulate the flow of fluids within the reservoir, over its production lifetime.

Sometimes a single "shared earth model" is used for both purposes. More commonly, a geological model is constructed at a relatively high (fine) resolution. A coarser grid for the reservoir simulation model is constructed, with perhaps two orders of magnitude fewer cells. Effective values of attributes for the simulation model are then derived from the geological model by an upscaling process. Alternatively, if no geological model exists, the attribute values for a simulation model may be determined by a process of sampling geological maps.

Uncertainty in the true values of the reservoir properties is sometimes investigated by constructing several different realizations of the sets of attribute values. The behaviour of the resulting simulation models can then indicate the associated level of economic uncertainty.

The phrase "reservoir characterization" is sometimes used to refer to reservoir modeling activities up to the point when a simulation model is ready to simulate the flow of fluids.

Commercially available software is used in the construction, simulation and analysis of the reservoir models.

== Seismic to simulation ==
The processes required to construct reservoir models are described by the phrase Seismic to simulation. The process is successful if the model accurately reflects the original well logs, seismic data and production history.

Reservoir models are constructed to gain a better understanding of the subsurface that leads to informed well placement, reserves estimation and production planning. Models are based on measurements taken in the field, including well logs, seismic surveys, and production history.

Seismic to simulation enables the quantitative integration of all field data into an updateable reservoir model built by a team of geologists, geophysicists, and engineers. Key techniques used in the process include integrated petrophysics and rock physics to determine the range of lithotypes and rock properties, geostatistical inversion to determine a set of plausible seismic-derived rock property models at sufficient vertical resolution and heterogeneity for flow simulation, stratigraphic grid transfer to accurately move seismic-derived data to the geologic model, and flow simulation for model validation and ranking to determine the model that best fits all the data.

=== Rock physics and petrophysics ===
The first step in seismic to simulation is establishing a relationship between petrophysical key rock properties and elastic properties of the rock. This is required in order to find common ground between the well logs and seismic data.

Well logs are measured in depth and provide high resolution vertical data, but no insight into the inter-well space. Seismic are measured in time and provide great lateral detail but is quite limited in its vertical resolution. When correlated, well logs and seismic can be used to create a fine-scale 3D model of the subsurface.

Insight into the rock properties comes from a combination of basic geologic understanding and well-bore measurements. Based on an understanding of how the area was formed over time, geologists can predict the types of rock likely to be present and how rapidly they vary spatially. Well log and core measurements provide samples to verify and fine-tune that understanding.

Seismic data is used by petrophysicists to identify the tops of various lithotypes and the distribution of rock properties in the inter-well space using seismic inversion attributes such as impedance. Seismic surveys measure acoustic impedance contrasts between rock layers. As different geologic structures are encountered, the sound wave reflects and refracts as a function of the impedance contrast between the layers. Acoustic impedance varies by rock type and can therefore be correlated to rock properties using rock physics relationships between the inversion attributes and petrophysical properties such as porosity, lithology, water saturation, and permeability.

Once well logs are properly conditioned and edited, a petrophysical rock model is generated that can be used to derive the effective elastic rock properties from fluid and mineral parameters as well as rock structure information. The model parameters are calibrated by comparison of the synthetic to the available elastic sonic logs. Calculations are performed following a number of rock physics algorithms including: Xu & White, Greenberg & Castagna, Gassmann, Gardner, modified upper and lower Hashin-Shtrikman, and Batzle & Wang.

When the petrophysical rock model is complete, a statistical database is created to describe the rock types and their known properties such as porosity and permeability. Lithotypes are described, along with their distinct elastic properties.

=== MCMC geostatistical inversion ===
In the next step of seismic to simulation, seismic inversion techniques combine well and seismic data to produce multiple equally plausible 3D models of the elastic properties of the reservoir. Seismic data is transformed to elastic property log(s) at every trace. Deterministic inversion techniques are used to provide a good overall view of the porosity over the field, and serve as a quality control check. To obtain greater detail needed for complex geology, additional stochastic inversion is then employed.

Geostatistical inversion procedures detect and delineate thin reservoirs otherwise poorly defined. Markov chain Monte Carlo (MCMC) based geostatistical inversion addresses the vertical scaling problem by creating seismic derived rock properties with vertical sampling compatible to geologic models.

All field data is incorporated into the geostatistical inversion process through the use of probability distribution functions (PDFs). Each PDF describes a particular input data in geostatistical terms using histograms and variograms, which identify the odds of a given value at a specific place and the overall expected scale and texture based on geologic insight.

Once constructed, the PDFs are combined using Bayesian inference, resulting in a posterior PDF that conforms to everything that is known about the field. A weighting system is used within the algorithm, making the process more objective.

From the posterior PDF, realizations are generated using a Markov chain Monte Carlo algorithm. These realizations are statistically fair and produce models of high detail, accuracy and realism. Rock properties like porosity can be cosimulated from the elastic properties determined by the geostatistical inversion. This process is iterated until a best fit model is identified.

Inversion parameters are tuned by running the inversion many times with and without well data. Without the well data, the inversions are running in blind-well mode. These blind-well mode inversions test the reliability of the constrained inversion and remove potential bias.

This statistical approach creates multiple, equi-probable models consistent with the seismic, wells, and geology. Geostatistical inversion simultaneously inverts for impedance and discrete properties types, and other petrophysical properties such as porosity can then be jointly cosimulated.

The output volumes are at a sample rate consistent with the reservoir model because making synthetics of finely sampled models is the same as from well logs. Inversion properties are consistent with well log properties because the histograms used to generate the output rock properties from the inversion are based on well log values for those rock properties.

Uncertainty is quantified by using random seeds to generate slightly differing realizations, particularly for areas of interest. This process improves the understanding of uncertainty and risk within the model.

=== Stratigraphic grid transfer ===
Following geostatistical inversion and in preparation for history matching and flow simulation, the static model is re-gridded and up-scaled. The transfer simultaneously converts time to depth for the various properties and transfers them in 3D from the seismic grid to a corner-point grid. The relative locations of properties are preserved, ensuring data points in the seismic grid arrive in the correct stratigraphic layer in the corner point grid.

The static model built from seismic is typically orthogonal but flow simulators expect corner point grids. The corner point grid consists of cubes that are usually much coarser in the horizontal direction and each corner of the cube is arbitrarily defined to follow the major features in the grid. Converting directly from orthogonal to corner point can cause problems such as creating discontinuity in fluid flow.

An intermediate stratigraphic grid ensures that important structures are not misrepresented in the transfer. The stratigraphic grid has the same number of cells as the orthogonal seismic grid, but the boundaries are defined by stratigraphic surfaces and the cells follow the stratigraphic organization. This is a stratigraphic representation of the seismic data using the seismic interpretation to define the layers. The stratigraphic grid model is then mapped to the corner point grid by adjusting the zones.

Using the porosity and permeability models and a saturation height function, initial saturation models are built. If volumetric calculations identify problems in the model, changes are made in the petrophysical model without causing the model to stray from the original input data. For example, sealing faults are added for greater compartmentalization.

=== Model validation and ranking ===
In the last step of seismic to simulation, flow simulation continues the integration process by bringing in the production history. This provides a further validation of the static model against history. A representative set of the model realizations from the geostatistical inversion are history matched against production data. If the properties in the model are realistic, simulated well bottom hole pressure behavior should match historical (measured) well bottom hole pressure. Production flow rates and other engineering data should also match.

Based on the quality of the match, some models are eliminated. After the initial history match process, dynamic well parameters are adjusted as needed for each of the remaining models to improve the match. The final model represents the best match to original field measurements and production data and is then used in drilling decisions and production planning.

== See also ==
- Extraction of petroleum
- Petroleum engineering
- Computer simulation
- Reservoir simulator
- Rise in Core
