= Computer Modelling Group =

Software company in Canada

Computer Modelling Group Ltd.
- Company type: Public
- Traded as: TSX: CMG
- Industry: Oil and gas
- Founded: 1978
- Founder: Khalid Aziz
- Headquarters: Calgary, Alberta, Canada
- Number of locations: 7
- Area served: Worldwide
- Products: Reservoir simulation software
- Services: Training, Consulting, Reservoir Simulation Software development
- Revenue: C$84.86 million (2015)
- Number of employees: 201–500
- Website: cmgl.ca

Computer Modelling Group Ltd., abbreviated as CMG, is a software company that produces reservoir simulation software for the oil and gas industry. It is based in Calgary, Alberta, Canada with branch offices in Houston, Dubai, Bogotá, Rio de Janeiro, London and Kuala Lumpur. The company is traded on the Toronto Stock Exchange under the symbol CMG.

The company offers three reservoir simulation applications. IMEX, a conventional black oil simulator used for primary, secondary and enhanced or improved oil recovery processes; GEM, an advanced Equation-of-State (EoS) compositional and unconventional simulator; and STARS a k-value thermal and advanced processes simulator. CMG also offers CMOST, a reservoir engineering tool that conducts automated history matching, sensitivity analysis and optimization of reservoir models. In addition, CMG has developed CoFlow, which is a unique production engineering software for wellbore and facility analysis and allows for smart coupling with reservoir models.

== History ==
The company began in 1978 as an effort to develop a simulator by Khalid Aziz of the University of Calgary's Chemical Engineering department, with a research grant from the government of Alberta. CMG became known for its expertise in heavy oil, and has expanded this knowledge into all aspects of reservoir flow and advanced processes modelling. A commercial product was available by the late 1980s. For the first 19 years of the company's history it was a non-profit entity. In 1997, CMG became a public company when it was listed on the TSX. The company now claims over 570 clients in 58 countries.

In May 2018, CMG President and CEO Kenneth Dedeluk announced his retirement following the company. Ryan Schneider was appointed to succeed Dedeluk.

On 31 July 2025, CMG announced the acquisition of SeisWare International, a geoscience software company, for an estimated purchase price of US$6.6 million, subject to customary closing adjustments. The company also reported that Herman Nieuwoudt, who became president of Bluware in November 2024, has been elevated to the role of executive vice president and president of Seismic Solutions. It was reported that the SeisWare workforce, comprising more than 40 employees based in Calgary and Houston, will be integrated into the seismic solutions division, and that SeisWare’s chief executive officer, Murray Brack, will transition to Computer Modelling Group as general manager of SeisWare, reporting to Nieuwoudt.

At its annual general meeting on 4 September 2025, the company announced the election of Anuroop Duggal and Andrew Pastor to its board of directors, with Pastor later designated as chair of the board.
