= TEM-function =

Measurement in petroleum engineering

In petroleum engineering, true effective mobility (TEM), also called TEM-function is a criterion to characterize dynamic two-phase flow characteristics of rocks (or dynamic rock quality). TEM is a function of relative permeability, porosity, absolute permeability and fluid viscosity, and can be determined for each fluid phase separately. TEM-function has been derived from Darcy's law for multiphase flow.

$$\mathit{TEM} =  \frac{k k_{\mathit{r}}}{\phi \mu}$$

in which $k$ is the absolute permeability, $k_\mathit{r}$ is the relative permeability, φ is the porosity, and μ is the fluid viscosity. Rocks with better fluid dynamics (i.e., experiencing a lower pressure drop in conducting a fluid phase) have higher TEM versus saturation curves. Rocks with lower TEM versus saturation curves resemble low quality systems.

TEM-function in analyzing relative permeability data is analogous with Leverett J-function in analyzing capillary pressure data. Furthermore, TEM-function in two-phase flow systems is an extension of RQI (rock quality index) for single-phase systems.

Also, TEM-function can be used for averaging relative permeability curves (for each fluid phase separately, i.e., water, oil, gas, CO_{2}).

$$\text{Average kr} = \frac{\sum_{i=1}^n\mathit{TEM}_i}{\sum_{i=1}^n\left(\frac{k}{\phi \mu}\right)_i} = \frac{\sum_{i=1}^n\left(\frac{k k_{\mathit{r}}}{\phi \mu}\right)_i}{\sum_{i=1}^n\left(\frac{k}{\phi \mu}\right)_i}$$

== See also ==
- Lak wettability index
- USBM wettability index
