= J-function =

J-function may refer to:

- The Klein j-invariant or j function in mathematics
- Leverett J-function in petroleum engineering
