= Lak wettability index =

In petroleum engineering, Lak wettability index is a quantitative indicator to measure wettability of rocks from relative permeability data. This index is based on a combination of Craig's first rule. and modified Craig's second rule

$$I_{\mathit{L}} = \frac{A (0.3 - k_{\mathit{rw,Sor}})} {\ 0.3} + \frac{B (0.5 - k_{\mathit{rw,Sor}})} {\ 0.5} + \frac{CS - RCS} {\ 1-Sor - Swc}$$

where

$I_{\mathit{L}}$ : Lak wettability index (index values near -1 and 1 represent strongly oil-wet and strongly water-wet rocks, respectively)
$k_{\mathit{rw,Sor}}$ : Water relative permeability measured at residual oil saturation
$CS$ : Water saturation at the intersection point of water and oil relative permeability curves (fraction)
$Sor$ : Residual oil saturation (in fraction)
$Swc$ : Irreducible water saturation (in fraction)
$RCS$ : Reference crossover saturation (in fraction) defined as:
$$RCS = 0.5 + \frac{Swc - Sor} {\ 2}$$

and $A$ and $B$ are two constant coefficients defined as:

$A = 0.5$ and $B = 0$ if $k_{\mathit{rw,Sor}} < 0.3$
$A = 0$ and $B = 0$ if $0.3 <= k_{\mathit{rw,Sor}} <= 0.5$
$A = 0$ and $B = 0.5$ if $k_{\mathit{rw,Sor}} > 0.5$

To use the above formula, relative permeability is defined as the effective permeability divided by the oil permeability measured at irreducible water saturation.

== Craig's triple rules of thumb ==
Craig proposed three rules of thumb for interpretation of wettability from relative permeability curves. These rules are based on the value of interstitial water saturation, the water saturation at the crossover point of relative permeability curves (i.e., where relative permeabilities are equal to each other), and the normalized water permeability at residual oil saturation (i.e., normalized by the oil permeability at interstitial water saturation). According to Craig's first rule of thumb, in water-wet rocks the relative permeability to water at residual oil saturation is generally less than 30%, whereas in oil-wet systems this is greater than 50% and approaching 100%. The second rule of thumb considers a system as water-wet, if saturation at the crossover point of relative permeability curves is greater than water saturation of 50%, otherwise oil-wet. The third rule of thumb states that in a water-wet rock the value of interstitial water saturation is usually greater than 20 to 25% pore volume, whereas this is generally less than 15% pore volume (frequently less than 10%) for an oil-wet porous medium.

== Modified Craig's second rule ==
In 2021, Abouzar Mirzaei-Paiaman investigated the validity of Craig's rules of thumb and showed that while the third rule is generally unreliable, the first rule is suitable. Moreover, he showed that the second rule needed a modification. He pointed out that using 50% water saturation as a reference value in the Craig's second rule is unrealistic. That author defined a reference crossover saturation (RCS). According to the modified Craig's second rule, the crossover point of relative permeability curves lies to the right of RCS in water-wet rocks, whereas for oil-wet systems, the crossover point is expected to be located at the left of the RCS.

== Modified Lak wettability index ==
Modified Lak wettability index exists which is based on the areas below water and oil relative permeability curves.

$$I_{\mathit{ML}} = \frac{A_{\mathit{o}} - A_{\mathit{w}}} {\ A_{\mathit{o}} + A_{\mathit{w}}}$$

where

$I_{\mathit{ML}}$ : modified Lak wettability index (index values near -1 and 1 represent strongly oil-wet and strongly water-wet rocks, respectively)
$A_{\mathit{o}}$ : Area under the oil relative permeability curve
$A_{\mathit{w}}$ : Area under the water relative permeability curve

== See also ==
- Wetting
- Amott test
- Relative permeability
- TEM-function
- USBM wettability index
