= Special core analysis =

In the petroleum industry, special core analysis, often abbreviated SCAL or SPCAN, is a laboratory procedure for conducting flow experiments on core plugs taken from a petroleum reservoir. Special core analysis is distinguished from "routine (RCAL) or conventional (CCAL) core analysis" by adding more experiments, in particular including measurements of two-phase flow properties, determining relative permeability, capillary pressure, wettability, and electrical properties. Due to the time-consuming and costly character of SCAL measurements, routine core analysis (RCAL) data should be inspected thoroughly to select a representative subset of samples for SCAL.

== See also ==
- Core sample
- Petrophysics
- Porosity
