= Black-oil equations =

The black-oil equations are a set of partial differential equations that describe fluid flow in a petroleum reservoir, constituting the mathematical framework for a black-oil reservoir simulator. The term black-oil refers to the fluid model, in which water is modeled explicitly together with two hydrocarbon components, one (pseudo) oil phase and one (pseudo-)gas phase. This is in contrast with a compositional formulation, in which each hydrocarbon component (arbitrary number) is handled separately.

The equations of an extended black-oil model are:

$$\frac{\partial}{\partial t}\left[\phi\left(\frac{S_o}{B_o}+\frac{R_VS_g}{B_g}\right)\right]
+\nabla\cdot\left(
\frac{1}{B_o}\vec u_o+\frac{R_V}{B_g}\vec u_g\right)= 0$$

$$\frac{\partial}{\partial t}\left[\phi\left(\frac{S_w}{B_w}\right)\right]
+\nabla\cdot\left(
\frac{1}{B_w}\vec u_w\right)= 0$$

$$\frac{\partial}{\partial t}\left[\phi\left(\frac{R_S S_o}{B_o}+\frac{S_g}{B_g}\right)\right]
+\nabla\cdot\left(
\frac{R_S}{B_o}\vec u_o+\frac{1}{B_g}\vec u_g\right)= 0$$

where $\phi$ is a porosity of the porous medium, $S_w$ is a water saturation, $S_o,S_g$ are saturations of liquid ("oil") and vapor ("gas") phases in the reservoir, $\vec u_o,\vec u_w,\vec u_g$ are Darcy velocities of the liquid phase, water phase and vapor phase in the reservoir. The oil and gas at the surface (standard conditions) could be produced from both liquid and vapor phases existing at high pressure and temperature of reservoir conditions. This is characterized by the following quantities:

$B_o$ is an oil formation volume factor (ratio of some volume of reservoir liquid to the volume of oil at standard conditions obtained from the same volume of reservoir liquid),

$B_w$ is a water formation volume factor (ratio of volume of water at reservoir conditions to volume of water at standard conditions),

$B_g$ is a gas formation volume factor (ratio of some volume of reservoir vapor to the volume of gas at standard conditions obtained from the same volume of reservoir vapor),

$R_S$ is a solution of gas in oil phase (ratio of volume of gas to the volume of oil at standard conditions obtained from some amount of liquid phase at reservoir conditions),

$R_V$ is a vaporized oil in gas phase (ratio of volume of oil to the volume of gas at standard conditions obtained from some amount of vapor phase at reservoir conditions).

== See also ==
- Porous medium
- Darcy's law
- Relative permeability
- Petroleum
- Hydrocarbon
