= Chris Oynes =

American lawyer and federal government administrator

- Born: 28 April 1947; Anaheim, California
- Died: 18 October 2017 (aged 70); Baton Rouge, Louisiana
- Education: California State University, Fullerton; George Washington University

Chris Craig Oynes (28 April 1947 – 18 October 2017) was an American lawyer and federal government administrator.

Oynes was born in Anaheim, California to Christian and Lorraine Oynes. Oynes received a BA degree in political science from California State University, Fullerton, and he received a JD degree from George Washington University.

Oynes served as U.S. Minerals Management Service (MMS) associate director for offshore energy and minerals management before he retired in May 2010. During the 1990s, Oynes served as Deputy Regional Director of the Gulf of Mexico Outer Continental Shelf (OCS) Region, and he was named Regional Director of that office in 1995. Oynes who oversaw oil and gas leasing in the Gulf of Mexico for 13 years before being promoted to MMS associate director. In his duties as Regional Director of the Gulf of Mexico office, Oynes' managed the leasing of the OCS lands for oil, gas, and other marine minerals. This office was also responsible for environmental protection of these leased areas. Oynes supervised a staff of 550 federal employees, including environmental scientists, biologists, geologists, geophysicists, and petroleum engineers. Oynes had come under fire for being too close to the industry officials he regulated.

During his tenure at the Gulf regional office in Louisiana for the MMS, Oynes played a central role in an offshore leasing foul-up that cost taxpayers an estimated $10 billion in lost revenue. The Interior Department's inspector general called the matter "a jaw-dropping example of bureaucratic bungling." Despite that, the agency's then-director, Johnnie Burton, promoted Oynes in 2007 to associate director for the offshore program.

On May 24, 2010 The New York Times reported that under his watch in the Gulf, MMS regulators allowed industry officials to fill in their own inspection reports in pencil and then turned them over to the regulators, who traced over them in pen before submitting the reports to the agency. MMS staff also routinely accepted meals, tickets to sporting events and other gifts from oil companies. In 2008, a report from the Interior Department's Inspector-General found that MMS employees had received improper gifts from energy industry representatives. Another Inspector General report from 2010 found additional ethical lapses involving MMS employees and employees from oil and gas companies.

Lee Tilton, the former Chief, Office of Congressional Affairs (OCA), for the Bureau of Ocean Energy Management, was a former protégé of Chris Oynes.

In the wake of the Deepwater Horizon oil spill, Oynes announced that he would retire at the end of May 2010. According to the Minerals Management website, Oynes had "...more than 30 years of Federal Government experience..."

Oynes died on 18 October 2017 in Baton Rouge, Louisiana.
