= Kamy Sepehrnoori =

Kamy Sepehrnoori (born 1951) is Texaco Centennial Professor in petroleum engineering at the University of Texas at Austin, where he has been teaching since 1981.

He received his B.S. (mechanical engineering, 1973), M.S. (engineering, 1974), and Ph.D. degrees (petroleum engineering, 1977) from the University of Texas.

His research has focused on computational mechanics, reservoir simulation, numerical solutions to partial differential equations, enhanced oil recovery modeling, high-performance computing, and CO2 sequestration. He has authored six books, and published more than 800 technical articles. reports, and conference proceedings.
