= Worst Case Discharge =

Worst Case Discharge (WCD) is a calculation used by the Bureau of Ocean Energy Management, Regulation and Enforcement to determine the maximum flow rate for an offshore oil well in the event of an oil spill. WCD first came to prominence in the aftermath of the Deepwater Horizon Oil Spill to determine potential liability if another oil spill were to occur.

== History ==
The now defunct Minerals Management Service planned to implement Worst Case Discharge studies before the Deepwater Horizon Oil Spill though the first actual was performed in August 2010 to model the Deepwater Horizon spill. In January 2011, several major oil and gas companies were allowed to resume deepwater drilling while Worst Case Discharge studies were being completed. In March 2011, the Worst Case Discharge study on the Deepwater Horizon Oil Spill was released to the public in the Flow Rate Technical Group final report.

== Calculation methods ==
=== Analytical equations ===
Analytical equations are the simplest method for calculating WCD. However analytical equations cannot account for the rapid change in pressure and saturation near the well bore and have been replaced by simulation modeling.

=== Reservoir simulation ===
Reservoir simulation is the method used by the BOEMRE to calculate WCD as simulation can accurately model the rapid changes near well bore that occur in an uncontrolled blow out event. The BOEMRE currently uses the Merlin finite difference simulator and nodal analysis package to perform all WCD studies since using the software to determine the official flow rate for the Deepwater Horizon Oil Spill. Engineers typically use radial modeling to calculate WCD as a radial model can employ sufficiently small grid cell sizes around the well bore that increase in volume as cells extend into the aquifer.

Full field modeling is generally only needed if a geologic barrier like a fault or pinch out is close enough to the well being studied there is pressure interference. Engineers also need to calculate the highest rate in each combination of geologic layers as the well is drilled. The WCD rate can be higher in certain cases if specific layers blowout rather than the entire reservoir as different combinations of aquifers, gas layers, and oil layers can limit or enhance flow.
