= Buckley–Leverett equation =

Conservation law for two-phase flow in porous media

In fluid dynamics, the Buckley–Leverett equation is a conservation equation used to model two-phase flow in porous media. The Buckley–Leverett equation or the Buckley–Leverett displacement describes an immiscible displacement process, such as the displacement of oil by water, in a one-dimensional or quasi-one-dimensional reservoir. This equation can be derived from the mass conservation equations of two-phase flow, under the assumptions listed below.

== Equation ==
In a quasi-1D domain, the Buckley–Leverett equation is given by:

$$\frac{\partial S_w}{\partial t} + \frac{\partial}{\partial x}\left( \frac{Q}{\phi A} f_w(S_w) \right) = 0,$$

where $S_w(x,t)$ is the wetting-phase (water) saturation, $Q$ is the total flow rate, $\phi$ is the rock porosity, $A$ is the area of the cross-section in the sample volume, and $f_w(S_w)$ is the fractional flow function of the wetting phase. Typically, $f_w(S_w)$ is an S-shaped, nonlinear function of the saturation $S_w$, which characterizes the relative mobilities of the two phases:

$$f_w(S_w) = \frac{\lambda_w}{\lambda_w + \lambda_n} = \frac{ \frac{k_{rw}}{\mu_w} }{ \frac{k_{rw}}{\mu_w} + \frac{k_{rn}}{\mu_n} },$$

where $\lambda_w$ and $\lambda_n$ denote the wetting and non-wetting phase mobilities. $k_{rw}(S_w)$ and $k_{rn}(S_w)$ denote the relative permeability functions of each phase and $\mu_w$ and $\mu_n$ represent the phase viscosities.

== Assumptions ==
The Buckley–Leverett equation is derived based on the following assumptions:

- Flow is linear and horizontal
- Both wetting and non-wetting phases are incompressible
- Immiscible phases
- Negligible capillary pressure effects (this implies that the pressures of the two phases are equal)
- Negligible gravitational forces

== General solution ==
The characteristic velocity of the Buckley–Leverett equation is given by:

$$U(S_w) = \frac{Q}{\phi A} \frac{\mathrm{d} f_w}{\mathrm{d} S_w}.$$

The hyperbolic nature of the equation implies that the solution of the Buckley–Leverett equation has the form $S_w(x,t) = S_w(x - U t)$, where $U$ is the characteristic velocity given above. The non-convexity of the fractional flow function $f_w(S_w)$ also gives rise to the well known Buckley-Leverett profile, which consists of a shock wave immediately followed by a rarefaction wave.

== See also ==
- Capillary pressure
- Permeability (fluid)
- Relative permeability
- Darcy's law
