= Deep Water Royalty Relief Act =

US law to promote offshore oil production

Outer Continental Shelf Deep Water Royalty Relief Act
- Other short titles: Deep Water Royalty Relief Act
- Long title: An Act to authorize and direct the Secretary of Energy to sell the Alaska Power Administration, and to authorize the export of Alaska North Slope crude oil, and for other purposes.
- Acronyms (colloquial): DWRRA
- Enacted by: the 104 United States Congress
- Effective: November 28, 1995

Citations
- Public law: Pub. L. 104–58 (text) (PDF)
- Statutes at Large: 109 Stat. 564

Codification
- Acts amended: Outer Continental Shelf Lands Act
- U.S.C. sections amended: 43 U.S.C. § 1337

Legislative history
- Introduced in the Senate as S. 395 by Frank Murkowski (R‑AK) on February 13, 1995; Committee consideration by Senate Energy and Natural Resources; Passed the Senate on May 16, 1995 (74–25); Passed the House on July 25, 1995 (Passed without objection); Signed into law by President Bill Clinton on November 28, 1995

The United States Deep Water Royalty Relief Act (DWRRA) implemented a royalty-relief program that relieves eligible leases from paying royalties on defined amounts of deep-water petroleum production over Federal Outer Continental Shelf lands. After its expiration in 2000, the DWRRA was redefined and extended to promote continued interest in deep water. The Minerals Management Service (MMS) defines a "deep-water" lease as having a minimum water depth of 200 meters (656 ft).

== Description ==
Under the Outer Continental Shelf Lands Act, as amended in 1978, and under the provisions of the DWRRA of 1995, relief from royalty obligations may be granted to increase production or to encourage development on certain producing or non-producing leases. Royalty relief may be applied to either active leases or to newly offered leases directly in their fiscal terms. The primary MMS royalty relief programs include those that were required for Gulf of Mexico deepwater leases (located in water depth greater than 200 meters or 656 feet) issued in 1996–2000 under the DWRRA. After certain sunset provisions in the DWRRA expired in November 2000, the MMS adopted a program that provides lower amounts of royalty relief to each lease. The Federal Government has also offered royalty relief incentives since 2001 for natural gas production from certain deep wells in shallow water (15,000 feet total well depth) for newly issued leases, and commenced a similar program for active shallow water leases where drilling started on or after 26 March 2003.

The Energy Information Administration estimates there were 18,812 billion cubic feet (Bcf) of dry natural gas proved reserves and 4,144 million barrels (658,800,000 m^{3}) of crude oil proved reserves in the Federal Gulf of Mexico as of the end of 2004. About 45 percent of the natural gas proved reserves and 79 percent of the crude oil proved reserves in the Federal Gulf of Mexico are in deepwater areas, although not all of this is subject to royalty relief. The following sections highlight provisions in several rules and regulations under which oil and natural gas production volumes may receive royalty relief.

== Regulations, reports, and case law ==
The regulations to enforce the provisions of the Act are found in 30 CFR.

The United States General Accounting Office estimates that this Act will cost Billions of taxpayer dollars.

== See also ==
- Energy law
- United States energy law
