= Corner-point grid =

Space-filling tiling with cells of 6 faces

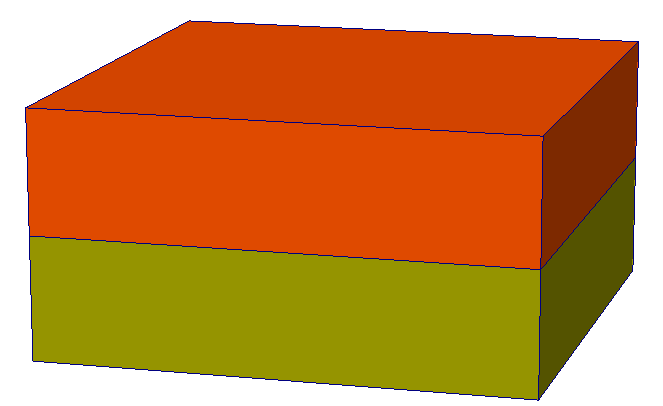
A trivial example of a Corner-point grid with only two cells.

In geometry, a corner-point grid is a tessellation of a Euclidean 3D volume, where the base cell has 6 faces (hexahedron).

A set of straight lines defined by their end points define the pillars of the corner-point grid. The pillars have a lexicographical ordering that determines neighbouring pillars. On each pillar, a constant number of nodes (corner-points) is defined. A corner-point cell is now the volume between 4 neighbouring pillars and two neighbouring points on each pillar.

Each cell can be identified by integer coordinates $(i,j,k)$, where the $k$ coordinate runs along the pillars, and $i$ and $j$ span each layer. The cells are ordered naturally, where the index $i$ runs the fastest and $k$ the slowest.

Data within the interior of such cells can be computed by trilinear interpolation from the boundary values at the 8 corners, 12 edges, and 6 faces.

In the special case of all pillars being vertical, the top and bottom face of each corner-point cell are described by bilinear surfaces and the side faces are planes.

Corner-point grids are supported by most reservoir simulation software, and has become an industry standard.

== Degeneracy ==
A main feature of the format is the ability to define erosion surfaces in geological modelling, effectively done by collapsing nodes along each pillar. This means that the corner-point cells degenerate and may have less than 6 faces.

For the corner-point grids, non-neighboring connections are supported, meaning that grid cells that are not neighboring in ijk-space can be defined as neighboring. This feature allows for representation of faults with significant throw/displacement. Moreover, the neighboring grid cells do not need to have matching cell faces (just overlap).
