= Flow Zone Unit =

A Flow Zone Unit is a term used by a Reservoir Engineer and is used in modelling the conditions in an oil reservoir. Flow units are defined with aim of better understanding reservoir unit flow behaviour and relation between porosity and permeability.
