= Minerals Management Service =

Former United States government agency

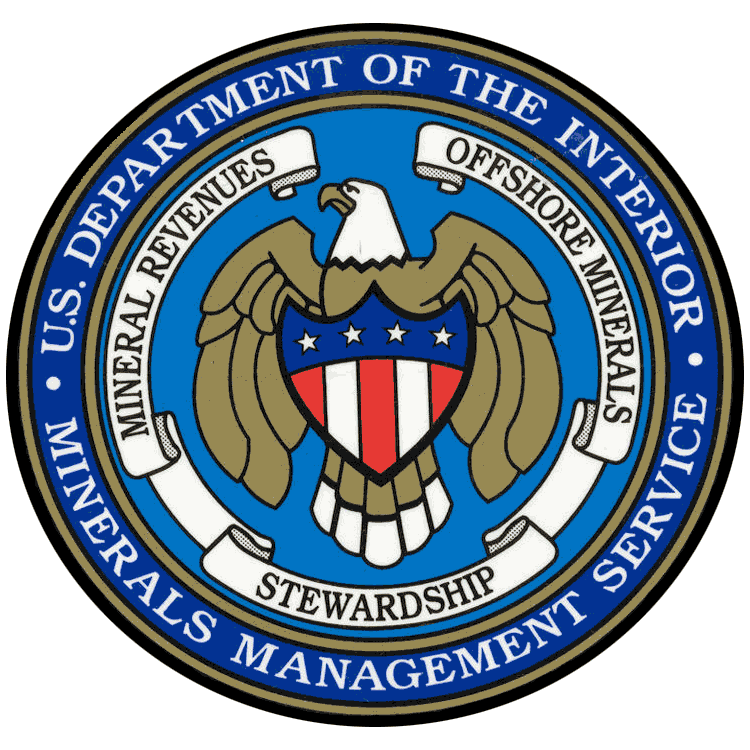

Agency overview
- Formed: January 19, 1982
- Dissolved: October 1, 2011
- Superseding agency: Bureau of Ocean Energy Management Bureau of Safety and Environmental Enforcement Office of Natural Resources Revenue
- Headquarters: Washington, D.C.
- Employees: 1,614 (2009)
- Annual budget: US$310 million (2009)
- Agency executive: Michael Bromwich, Director (June 15, 2010 – October 1, 2011)
- Parent agency: Department of the Interior

The Minerals Management Service (MMS) was an agency of the United States Department of the Interior that managed the nation's natural gas, oil and other mineral resources on the outer continental shelf (OCS).

Due to perceived conflict of interest and poor regulatory oversight following the Deepwater Horizon oil spill and Inspector General investigations, Secretary of the Interior Ken Salazar issued a secretarial order on May 19, 2010, splitting MMS into three new federal agencies: the Bureau of Ocean Energy Management, the Bureau of Safety and Environmental Enforcement, and the Office of Natural Resources Revenue. MMS was temporarily renamed the Bureau of Ocean Energy Management, Regulation and Enforcement (BOEMRE) during this reorganization before being formally dissolved on October 1, 2011.

Headquartered in Washington, DC, the Agency received most of its revenue from leasing federal lands and waters to oil and natural gas companies with a profit margin of 98%. It was among the top five revenue sources to the federal government, the IRS being number one. As the MMS (before transition to BOEMRE), the Agency's signature feature according to an informational trifold was that it had "become our Nation's leader in offshore energy development and the collection of royalties on behalf of the American Public." With respect to enforcement of regulations and safety, this same publication indicated that the "MMS also funds advanced scientific studies and enforces the highest safety and environmental standards." The Agency's mission statement was put more formally in its 2010 Budget Proposal:

MMS's mission is to manage the energy and mineral resources on the Outer Continental Shelf and Federal and American Indian mineral revenues to enhance public and trust benefits, promote responsible use, and realize fair value.

== History ==
The Minerals Management Service was created on January 19, 1982. In January 1983, Congress passed the Federal Oil and Gas Royalty Management Act with the stated purpose:

To ensure that all oil and gas originated on the public lands and on the Outer Continental Shelf are properly accounted for under the direction of the Secretary of the Interior, and for other purposes.

The Secretary of the Interior at the time, James G. Watt, designated MMS as the administrative agency responsible for execution of activities under the Act.

With the passage of the Energy Policy Act of 2005, MMS was given authority to develop renewable energy projects, such as wave, wind and current energy, on the Outer Continental Shelf. As of 2010, the agency was composed of two operating units, the MRM and OEMM.

- Offshore Energy and Minerals Management (OEMM) – Under the guidance of the 1953 Outer Continental Shelf Lands Act, the OEMM managed energy and mineral development in over 1.71 billion offshore acres of the Outer Continental Shelf (OCS) and annually disburses to the U.S. Treasury expected of $5 billion in minerals revenue in 2010.
- Minerals Revenue Management (MRM) – Through the MRM program, the agency collected, accounted for, and disbursed mineral revenues from federal and American Indian leases.

The agency's offshore renewable energy program included development of renewable energy, such as wind, wave, and solar.

Since its inception in 1982 through FY2008, the agency had disbursed approximately $200 billion to federal, state, and American Indian accounts.

On June 21, 2010, the Minerals Management Service was renamed the Bureau of Ocean Energy Management, Regulation and Enforcement and reorganized.

== Operations ==
As of 2009, the Agency employed about 1,600 people, which was proposed to grow by less than one hundred in 2010.

=== Organization ===
The BOEMRE was reorganized in May 2010 under the direction of Secretary of the Interior Ken Salazar following the Deepwater Horizon disaster. The bureau is organized into these three newly created agencies:

- Bureau of Ocean Energy Management – Responsible for leasing areas of the Outer Continental Shelf for conventional and renewable energy resources.
- Bureau of Safety and Environmental Enforcement – Responsible for ensuring comprehensive oversight, safety, and environmental protection in all offshore energy activities.
- Office of Natural Resources Revenue – Responsible for royalty and revenue management, including collection and distribution of revenue, auditing and compliance, and asset management.

== Criticism and controversies ==
Since the inception of the MMS, and in particular since the 1990s, the Agency has been embroiled or implicated in numerous scandals. For example, in 1990 MMS employees were linked to prostitution, and in 2008 the Department of Interior's Inspector General reported that MMS employees had participated in drug use and sexual activity with employees from the very energy firms they were to be regulating.

=== Collection of oil and gas royalties ===
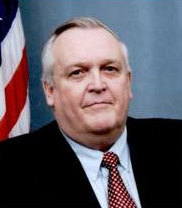
Inspector General Earl Devaney gave testimony on his investigation of the MMS gifts scandal: "I think there is a bar [against corporations offering gifts], but I think in this case a decision was made at the Department of Justice ... to approach the oil and gas people in a different way."

From the 1950s to at least 2002, drilling for oil and gas on federal lands and waters produced the second largest source of revenue for the federal government other than taxes. The Minerals Revenue Management (MRM) division of MMS was responsible for managing all royalties associated with both onshore and offshore oil and gas production from federal mineral leases. In 1997, in light of evidence that industry was getting around royalty regulations and underpaying royalties to the tune of billions of dollars, MMS proposed a more stringent rule to collect royalty payments in value (RIV), meaning in the form of cash payments from companies producing from federal leases. In response to that rule-making, industry proposed an alternative—"royalty-in-kind" (RIK) meaning in the form of actual oil or gas production. In fact, the industry opposed cash payments (RIV) and planned legal challenges to government efforts to establish regulations for fair market-based royalty payments. A pilot test of the RIK concept was conducted. The Bush administration allowed the pilot to expand to a full program, with industry support, even though the bill authorizing the program failed to pass in Congress. In FY2008, the RIK program accounted for more than 50% of the Agency's revenue collections. When MRM collected royalties-in-kind, the oil or gas received from producers was offered for sale by the U.S. Government on the open market and the proceeds from these sales were taken as revenues. The RIK program within MRM was responsible for managing these in-kind sales.

In 2003, the General Accounting Office (GAO) noted that the MMS had failed to develop "clear strategic objectives linked to statutory requirements nor collected the necessary information to effectively monitor and evaluate the Royalty-in-Kind Program". From 2003 to 2008, the GAO consistently challenged the legitimacy of the statistics published by the MMS that it used to support its claims that the RIK program was a success and justify its expansion. Deficits in accounting practices, policies and procedures, and information systems used by the MMS led to concerns that the industry was significantly underpaying on their royalty obligations. Computer systems in use by the Agency were considered to be sufficiently inadequate that a failure to report revenue or provide RIK by an industry member could not be reliably detected. For instance, the GAO estimated that underpayments amounted to ~$160 million USD in 2006. The GAO also disputed the practice of tracking oil and gas RIK deliveries on a monthly rather than daily basis, a practice used by the MMS and supported by the Department of the Interior, but potentially prone to abuse by producers. Other contributing factors to the placing the accuracy of revenue streams at risk were insufficiently trained personnel and insufficient numbers of personnel working in the RIK program and a lack of standard reporting method by industry members, leading to manual rather than computer-based processing of more than half of the data required for RIK data inputs.

Citing its scandals and the persistent incapacity of the RIK program to fulfill its statutory obligations, Interior Secretary Salazar announced in September 2009 that the RIK program would be shut down. Due to existing lease contracts with RIK provisions, the program as of 2010 is still winding down. On October 7, 2009, the U.S. House Oversight Committee reported the loss of billions in revenue resulting from MMS mismanagement and cozy relationships with industry officials. According to Darrell Issa, the top Republican on the United States House Committee on Oversight and Government Reform, there may be a conflict of interest for the Minerals Management Service to collect revenue and also oversee safety.

=== Gifts, gratuities and the revolving door ===
In September 2008, reports by the Inspector General of the Interior Department, Earl E. Devaney, were released that implicated over a dozen officials of the MMS of unethical and criminal conduct in the performance of their duties. The investigation found MMS employees had used cocaine and marijuana, and had sex with energy company representatives. MMS staff had also accepted gifts and free holidays amid "a culture of ethical failure", according to the investigation. The New York Times's summary states the investigation revealed "a dysfunctional organization that has been riddled with conflicts of interest, unprofessional behavior and a free-for-all atmosphere for much of the Bush administration's watch."

A May 2010 inspector general investigation revealed that MMS regulators in the Gulf region had allowed industry officials to fill in their own inspection reports in pencil and then turned them over to the regulators, who traced over them in pen before submitting the reports to the agency. MMS staff had routinely accepted meals, tickets to sporting events, and gifts from oil companies. Staffers also used government computers to view pornography. In 2009 the regional supervisor of the Gulf region for MMS pleaded guilty and was sentenced to a year's probation in federal court for lying about receiving gifts from an offshore drilling contractor. "This deeply disturbing report is further evidence of the cozy relationship between MMS and the oil and gas industry," Salazar said.

The Project On Government Oversight (POGO) alleges that MMS has suffered from a systemic revolving door problem between the Department of Interior and the oil and gas industries. For example, thirteen months after departing as MMS director, Bush appointee Randall Luthi became president of the National Oceans Industries Association (NOIA) whose mission is "to secure reliable access and a favorable regulatory and economic environment for the companies that develop the nation's valuable offshore energy resources in an environmentally responsible manner." Luthi succeeded Tom Fry, who was MMS director under the Clinton administration. Luthi and Fry represented precisely the industries their agency was tasked with being a watchdog over. Lower level administrators influencing MMS have also gone on to work for the companies they once regulated: In addition, Jimmy Mayberry served as Special Assistant to the Associate Director of Minerals Revenue Management (MRM), managed by MMS, from 2000 to January 2003. After he left, he created an energy consulting company that was awarded an MMS contract via a rigged bid. He was convicted along with a former MMS coworker Milton Dial who also came to work at the company. Both were found guilty of felony violation of conflict of interest law.

=== Deepwater Horizon catastrophe and restructuring ===
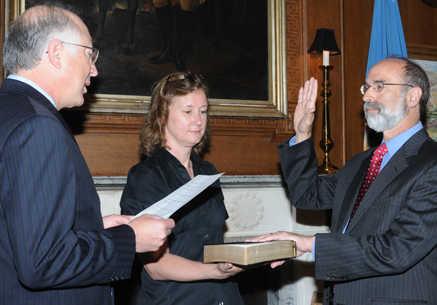
Secretary of the Interior Ken Salazar swears in Michael Bromwich as the new director of the Bureau on June 21, 2010. Betsy Hildebrandt, Department of Interior Communications Director holds the Bible.

On May 11, 2010, in response to the Deepwater Horizon oil spill, Secretary of the Interior Ken Salazar announced that MMS would be restructured so that the safety and environmental functions are carried out by a unit with full independence from MMS in order to ensure that federal inspectors will have more tools, resources, and greater authority to enforce laws and regulations that apply to oil and gas companies operating on the Outer Continental Shelf. Another outcome of the spill was the retirement of the associate director for offshore energy and minerals management at the time of the spill, Chris Oynes.

MMS's regulatory decisions contributing to the 2010 oil spill included, in negligence, the decision that an acoustically controlled shut-off valve (BOP) would not be required as a last resort against underwater spills at the site, MMS's failure to suggest other "fail-safe" mechanisms after a 2004 report raised questions about the reliability of the electrical remote-control devices., and the fact that MMS gave permission to dozens of oil companies to drill in the Gulf of Mexico without first getting required permits from the National Oceanic and Atmospheric Administration that assess threats to endangered species and to assess the impact the drilling was likely to have on the gulf.

On May 19, 2010 Salazar announced that MMS was to be broken up into three separate divisions, the Bureau of Ocean Energy Management, the Bureau of Safety and Environmental Enforcement, and the Office of Natural Resources Revenue, which will separately oversee energy leasing, safety enforcement, and revenue collection.

S. Elizabeth (Liz) Birnbaum served as the Director of the then named Minerals Management Service from July 15, 2009 to her resignation on May 27, 2010 amidst the Deepwater Horizon oil spill. On June 15, 2010 President Obama named Michael R. Bromwich, a former federal prosecutor and inspector general for the Justice Department, to head up efforts to restructure BOEMRE. Bob Abbey, then director of the Bureau of Land Management, took over as Acting Director of BOEMRE until his replacement could be confirmed. Amidst efforts to reorganize the beleaguered agency, on June 21, 2010, Bromwich was sworn in as BOEMRE's new director, and Secretary of the Interior Ken Salazar issued a Secretarial Order that renamed the Minerals Management Service the Bureau of Ocean Energy Management, Regulation and Enforcement. Almost a year later, William K. Reilly, who co-chaired the commission charged with investigating the Horizon blowout, was quoted as saying "they changed the name, but all the people are the same" and "it's embarrassing" in reference to the situation.

== See also ==
- Regulatory capture
- Center for Biological Diversity
- Deep Water Royalty Relief Act
- Endangered Species Act
- Marine Mammal Protection Act of 1972
- National Oceanic and Atmospheric Administration
- Offshore oil and gas in the United States
- Worst Case Discharge
