= USBM wettability index =

The U.S. Bureau of Mines (USBM), developed by Donaldson et al. in 1969, is a method to measure wettability of petroleum reservoir rocks. In this method, the areas under the forced displacement Capillary pressure curves of oil and water drive processes are denoted as $A1$ and $A2$ to calculate the USBM index.

$$USBM = log\frac{A_{\mathit{1}}} {\ A_{\mathit{2}}}$$

USBM index is positive for water-wet rocks, and negative for oil-wet systems.

== Bounded USBM (or USBM*) ==
The USBM index is theoretically unbounded and can vary from negative infinity to positive infinity. Since other wettability indices such as Amott-Harvey, Lak wettability index and modified Lak are bounded in the range of -1 to 1, Abouzar Mirzaei-Paiaman highlighted the bounded form of USBM (called USBM*) as a replacement of the traditional USBM as

$$USBM* = \frac{A_{\mathit{1}}-A_{\mathit{2}}} {\ A_{\mathit{1}}+A_{\mathit{2}}}$$

USBM* varies from -1 to 1 for strongly oil-wet and strongly water-wet rocks, respectively.

== See also ==
- Wetting
- Amott test
- Lak wettability index
