= Imbibition =

Absorption of liquid by a colloid

Imbibition is a special type of diffusion that takes place when liquid is absorbed by solids-colloids causing an increase in volume. Water surface potential movement takes place along a concentration gradient; some dry materials absorb water. A gradient between the absorbent and the liquid is essential for imbibition. For a substance to imbibe a liquid, there must first be some attraction between them. Imbibition occurs when a wetting fluid displaces a non-wetting fluid, the opposite of drainage in which a non-wetting phase displaces the wetting fluid. The two processes are governed by different mechanisms. Imbibition can also be said as a type of diffusion since water movement is along the concentration gradient. Seeds and other such materials have almost no water hence they absorb water easily. Water potential gradient between the absorbent and liquid imbibed is essential for imbibition.

== Examples ==
One example of Imbibition in nature is the absorption of water by hydrophilic colloids. Matrix potential contributes significantly to water in such substances. Dry seeds germinate in part by imbibition. Imbibition can also control circadian rhythms in Arabidopsis thaliana and (probably) other plants. The Amott test employs imbibition.

Proteins have high imbibition capacities, so proteinaceous pea seeds swell more than starchy wheat seeds.

Imbibition of water increases imbibant volume, which results in imbibitional pressure (IP). The magnitude of such pressure can be demonstrated by the splitting of rocks by inserting dry wooden stalks in their crevices and soaking them in water, a technique used by early Egyptians to cleave stone blocks.

Skin grafts (split thickness and full thickness) receive oxygenation and nutrition via imbibition, maintaining cellular viability until the processes of inosculation and revascularisation have re-established a new blood supply within these tissues.

=== Germination ===
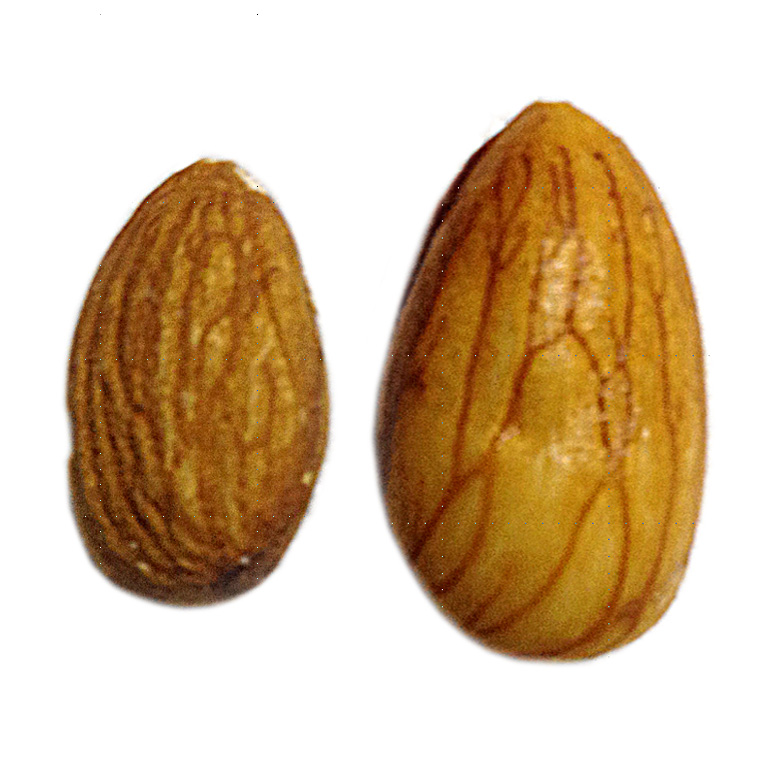
An apricot seed, dry (l) & imbibed (r)

Examples include the absorption of water by seeds and dry wood. If there is no pressure due to imbibition, seedlings would not be able to emerge from soil.

==== Radicle growth ====
The radicle is the first part of a seedling (a growing plant embryo) to emerge from the seed during the process of germination. The radicle is the embryonic root of the plant, and grows downward in the soil (the shoot emerges from the plumule) where it absorbs more water. Most of the seed is stored energy so nutrients are not essential during the first days for the seedling.

== See also ==
- Amott test
- Dye-transfer process
- Syneresis (chemistry)
- Technicolor
