= Leverett J-function =

Function in fluid dynamics

In fluid dynamics and geology, the Leverett J-function is a dimensionless function used to describe the capillary pressure required to force a fluid into the pores of a material like rock. Its primary purpose is to allow engineers and scientists to relate data from a specific rock sample to other similar rocks that may have different physical properties. It provides a way to convert complex capillary pressure data from multiple rock types into a single, universal curve for a given reservoir or formation.

== Definition and formulation ==
The function is based on the assumption that a porous rock can be modeled as a bundle of non-connecting capillary tubes. The J-function is defined as:

$$J(S_w) = \frac{p_c(S_w) \sqrt{k/\phi}}{\gamma \cos \theta}$$

where:

- $S_w$ is the water saturation, measured as a fraction
- $p_c$ is the capillary pressure (in pascals)
- $k$ is the permeability (in m²)
- $\phi$ is the porosity (dimensionless, 0–1)
- $\gamma$ is the surface tension (in N/m)
- $\theta$ is the contact angle (in degrees or radians)

The term $\sqrt{k/\phi}$ represents a characteristic length of the pore radii, allowing the function to normalize for differences in the rock's geological structure.

The function is important in that it is constant for a given saturation within a reservoir, thus relating reservoir properties for neighboring beds.

== Applications ==
=== Petroleum engineering ===
The function is important in petroleum engineering because for a given fluid saturation ($S_w$), its value is considered constant for a specific reservoir. This allows engineers to measure capillary pressure on a small rock core in a laboratory and then extrapolate that data to understand fluid behavior across large areas of the reservoir, even where permeability and porosity may vary.

=== Fuel cells ===
This function is also widely used in modeling the two-phase flow of water and gas within Proton exchange membrane fuel cells. A high degree of hydration is needed for good proton conductivity, but excessive liquid water saturation in the pores of the catalyst layer or diffusion media can impede the transport of gas to the cathode, reducing performance. The J-function helps model and manage this balance.

== See also ==
- Amott test
