= Hazen–Williams equation =

Equation on water flow in pipes

The Hazen–Williams equation is an empirical relationship that relates the flow of water in a pipe with the physical properties of the pipe and the pressure drop caused by friction. It is used in the design of water pipe systems such as fire sprinkler systems, water supply networks, and irrigation systems. It is named after Allen Hazen and Gardner Stewart Williams.

The Hazen–Williams equation has the advantage that the coefficient C is not a function of the Reynolds number, but it has the disadvantage that it is only valid for water. Also, it does not account for the temperature or viscosity of the water, and therefore is only valid at room temperature and conventional velocities.

== General form ==
Henri Pitot discovered that the velocity of a fluid was proportional to the square root of its head in the early 18th century. It takes energy to push a fluid through a pipe, and Antoine de Chézy discovered that the hydraulic head loss was proportional to the velocity squared. Consequently, the Chézy formula relates hydraulic slope S (head loss per unit length) to the fluid velocity V and hydraulic radius R:

$$V=C\sqrt{RS}=C\, R^{0.5}\, S^{0.5}$$

The variable C expresses the proportionality, but the value of C is not a constant. In 1838 and 1839, Gotthilf Hagen and Jean Léonard Marie Poiseuille independently determined a head loss equation for laminar flow, the Hagen–Poiseuille equation. Around 1845, Julius Weisbach and Henry Darcy developed the Darcy–Weisbach equation.

The Darcy-Weisbach equation was difficult to use because the friction factor was difficult to estimate. In 1906, Hazen and Williams provided an empirical formula that was easy to use. The general form of the equation relates the mean velocity of water in a pipe with the geometric properties of the pipe and the slope of the energy line.

$$V = k\, C\, R^{0.63}\, S^{0.54}$$

where:

- V is velocity (in ft/s for US customary units, in m/s for SI units)
- k is a conversion factor for the unit system (k = 1.318 for US customary units, k = 0.849 for SI units)
- C is a roughness coefficient
- R is the hydraulic radius (in ft for US customary units, in m for SI units)
- S is the slope of the energy line (head loss per length of pipe or h_{f}/L)

The equation is similar to the Chézy formula but the exponents have been adjusted to better fit data from typical engineering situations. A result of adjusting the exponents is that the value of C appears more like a constant over a wide range of the other parameters.

The conversion factor k was chosen so that the values for C were the same as in the Chézy formula for the typical hydraulic slope of S=0.001. The value of k is 0.001^{−0.04}.

Typical C factors used in design, which take into account some increase in roughness as pipes age, are as follows:

Material	C Factor low	C Factor high	Reference
Asbestos-cement	140	140	-
Cast iron new	130	130	
Cast iron 10 years	107	113	
Cast iron 20 years	89	100	
Cement-Mortar Lined Ductile Iron Pipe	140	140	–
Concrete	100	140	
Copper	130	140	
Steel	90	120	–
Galvanized iron	120	120	
Polyethylene	140	140	
Polyvinyl chloride (PVC)	150	150	
Fibre-reinforced plastic (FRP)	150	150	

== Pipe equation ==
The general form can be specialized for full pipe flows. Taking the general form

$$V = k\, C\, R^{0.63}\, S^{0.54}$$

and exponentiating each side by 1/0.54 gives (rounding exponents to 3–4 decimals)

$$V^{1.852} = k^{1.852}\, C^{1.852}\, R^{1.167}\, S$$

Rearranging gives

$$S = {V^{1.852} \over k^{1.852}\, C^{1.852}\, R^{1.167}}$$

The flow rate Q = V A, so

$$S = {V^{1.852} A^{1.852}\over k^{1.852}\, C^{1.852}\, R^{1.167}\, A^{1.852}} = {Q^{1.852}\over k^{1.852}\, C^{1.852}\, R^{1.167}\, A^{1.852}}$$

The hydraulic radius R (which is different from the geometric radius r) for a full pipe of geometric diameter d is d/4; the pipe's cross sectional area A is π d^{2} / 4, so

$$S =  {4^{1.167}\, 4^{1.852}\,Q^{1.852}\over \pi^{1.852}\,k^{1.852}\, C^{1.852}\, d^{1.167}\, d^{3.7034}}
=  {4^{3.019}\,Q^{1.852}\over \pi^{1.852}\,k^{1.852}\, C^{1.852}\, d^{4.8704}}
=  { 4^{3.019} \over \pi^{1.852}\,k^{1.852}} {Q^{1.852}\over C^{1.852}\, d^{4.8704}}
=  { 7.8828 \over k^{1.852}} {Q^{1.852}\over C^{1.852}\, d^{4.8704}}$$

=== U.S. customary units (Imperial) ===
When used to calculate the pressure drop using the US customary units system, the equation is:

$$S_{\mathrm{psi\ per\ foot}} = \frac{P_d}{L} = \frac{4.52\ Q^{1.852}}{C^{1.852}\ d^{4.8704}}$$

where:

- S_{psi per foot} = frictional resistance (pressure drop per foot of pipe) in psig/ft (pounds per square inch gauge pressure per foot)
- S_{foot of water per foot of pipe}
- P_{d} = pressure drop over the length of pipe in psig (pounds per square inch gauge pressure)
- L = length of pipe in feet
- Q = flow, gpm (gallons per minute)
- C = pipe roughness coefficient
- d = inside pipe diameter, in (inches)

Note: Caution with U S Customary Units is advised. The equation for head loss in pipes, also referred to as slope, S, expressed in "feet per foot of length" vs. in 'psi per foot of length' as described above, with the inside pipe diameter, d, being entered in feet vs. inches, and the flow rate, Q, being entered in cubic feet per second, cfs, vs. gallons per minute, gpm, appears very similar. However, the constant is 4.73 vs. the 4.52 constant as shown above in the formula as arranged by NFPA for sprinkler system design. The exponents and the Hazen-Williams "C" values are unchanged.

=== SI units ===
When used to calculate the head loss with the International System of Units, the equation will then become

$$S = \frac{h_f}{L} = \frac{10.67\ Q^{1.852}}{C^{1.852}\ d^{4.8704}}$$

where:

- S = hydraulic slope
- h_{f} = head loss in meters (water) over the length of pipe
- L = length of pipe in meters
- Q = volumetric flow rate, m^{3}/s (cubic meters per second)
- C = pipe roughness coefficient
- d = inside pipe diameter, m (meters)

Note: pressure drop can be computed from head loss as h_{f} × the unit weight of water (e.g., 9810 N/m^{3} at 4 deg C)

== See also ==
- Darcy–Weisbach equation and Prony equation for alternatives
- Fluid dynamics
- Friction
- Minor losses in pipe flow
- Plumbing
- Pressure
- Volumetric flow rate
