= Friction loss =

Loss of fluid flow through friction

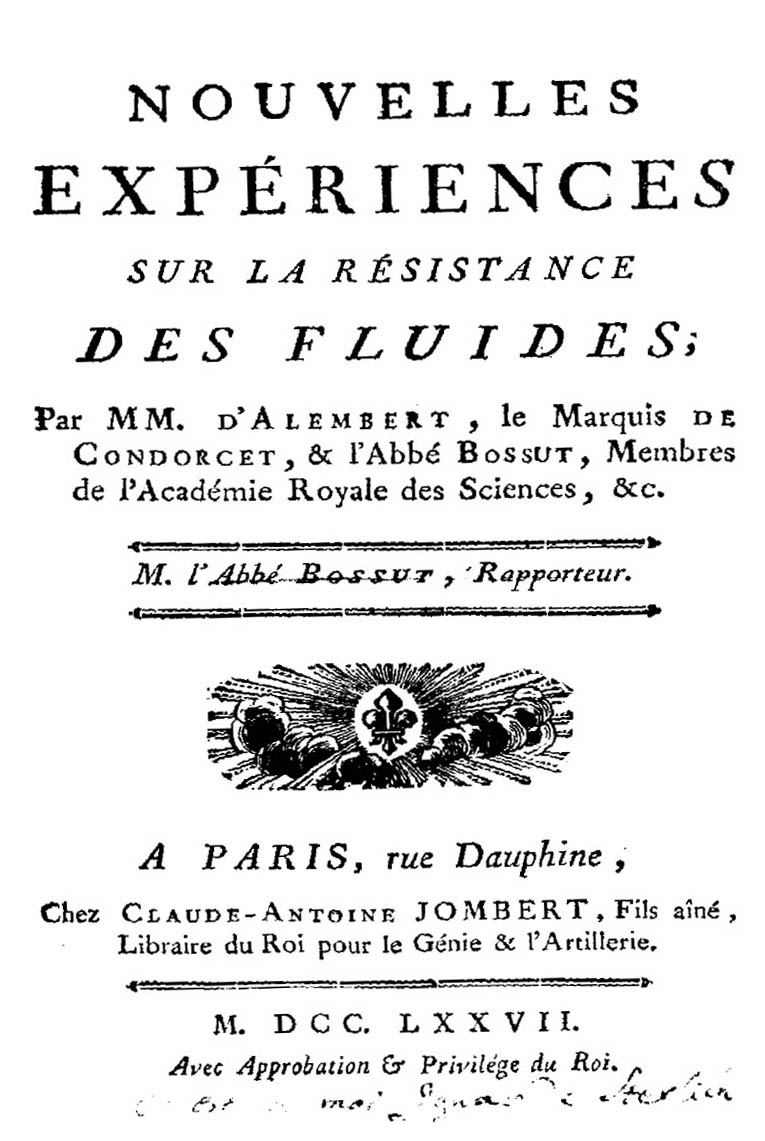
Jean Le Rond d'Alembert, Nouvelles expériences sur la résistance des fluides, 1777

In fluid dynamics, friction loss (or frictional loss) is the head loss that occurs in a containment such as a pipe or duct due to the effect of the fluid's viscosity near the surface of the containment.

== Engineering ==
Friction loss is a significant engineering concern wherever fluids are made to flow, whether entirely enclosed in a pipe or duct, or with a surface open to the air.

- Historically, it is a concern in aqueducts of all kinds, throughout human history. It is also relevant to sewer lines. Systematic study traces back to Henry Darcy, an aqueduct engineer.
- Natural flows in river beds are important to human activity; friction loss in a stream bed has an effect on the height of the flow, particularly significant during flooding.
- The economies of pipelines for petrochemical delivery are highly affected by friction loss. The Yamal–Europe pipeline carries methane at a volume flow rate of 32.3 billion m^{3} of gas per year, at Reynolds numbers greater than 50 million.
- In hydropower applications, the energy lost to skin friction in flume and penstock is not available for useful work, say generating electricity.
- In refrigeration applications, energy is expended pumping the coolant fluid through pipes or through the condenser. In split systems, the pipes carrying the coolant take the place of the air ducts in HVAC systems.

== Calculating volumetric flow ==
In the following discussion, we define volumetric flow rate V̇ (i.e. volume of fluid flowing per time) as

$\dot{V} = \pi r^2 v$

where

r = radius of the pipe (for a pipe of circular section, the internal radius of the pipe).
v = mean velocity of fluid flowing through the pipe.
A = cross sectional area of the pipe.

In long pipes, the loss in pressure (assuming the pipe is level) is proportional to the length of pipe involved. Friction loss is then the change in pressure Δp per unit length of pipe L

$$\frac{ \Delta p }{ L }.$$

When the pressure is expressed in terms of the equivalent height of a column of that fluid, as is common with water, the friction loss is expressed as S, the "head loss" per length of pipe, a dimensionless quantity also known as the hydraulic slope.

$$S = \frac{h_f }{ L } = \frac{ 1 }{ \rho  \mathrm{g} } \frac{ \Delta p }{ L } .$$

where

ρ = density of the fluid, (SI kg / m^{3})
g = the local acceleration due to gravity;

== Characterizing friction loss ==
Friction loss, which is due to the shear stress between the pipe surface and the fluid flowing within, depends on the conditions of flow and the physical properties of the system. These conditions can be encapsulated into a dimensionless number Re, known as the Reynolds number

$$\mathrm{Re}=\frac{1}{\nu}VD$$

where V is the mean fluid velocity and D the diameter of the (cylindrical) pipe. In this expression, the properties of the fluid itself are reduced to the kinematic viscosity ν

$$\nu=\frac{\mu}{\rho}$$

where

μ = viscosity of the fluid (SI kg / m • s)

=== Friction loss in straight pipe ===
The friction loss in uniform, straight sections of pipe, known as "major loss", is caused by the effects of viscosity, the movement of fluid molecules against each other or against the (possibly rough) wall of the pipe. Here, it is greatly affected by whether the flow is laminar (Re < 2000) or turbulent (Re > 4000):

- In laminar flow, losses are proportional to fluid velocity, V; that velocity varies smoothly between the bulk of the fluid and the pipe surface, where it is zero. The roughness of the pipe surface influences neither the fluid flow nor the friction loss.
- In turbulent flow, losses are proportional to the square of the fluid velocity, V^{2}; here, a layer of chaotic eddies and vortices near the pipe surface, called the viscous sub-layer, forms the transition to the bulk flow. In this domain, the effects of the roughness of the pipe surface must be considered. It is useful to characterize that roughness as the ratio of the roughness height ε to the pipe diameter D, the "relative roughness". Three sub-domains pertain to turbulent flow:
  - In the smooth pipe domain, friction loss is relatively insensitive to roughness.
  - In the rough pipe domain, friction loss is dominated by the relative roughness and is insensitive to Reynolds number.
  - In the transition domain, friction loss is sensitive to both.
- For Reynolds numbers 2000 < Re < 4000, the flow is unstable, varying with time as vortices within the flow form and vanish randomly. This domain of flow is not well modeled, nor are the details well understood.

=== Form friction ===
Factors other than straight pipe flow induce friction loss; these are known as "minor loss":

- Fittings, such as bends, couplings, valves, or transitions in hose or pipe diameter, or
- Objects intruded into the fluid flow.

For the purposes of calculating the total friction loss of a system, the sources of form friction are sometimes reduced to an equivalent length of pipe.

== Surface roughness ==
The roughness of the surface of the pipe or duct affects the fluid flow in the regime of turbulent flow. Usually denoted by ε, values used for calculations of water flow, for some representative materials are:

Surface Roughness ε (for water pipes)
| Material | mm | in |
|---|---|---|
| Corrugated plastic pipes (apparent roughness) | 3.5 | 0.14 |
| Mature foul sewers | 3.0 | 0.12 |
| Steel water mains with general tuberculations | 1.2 | 0.047 |
| Riveted Steel | 0.9–9.0 | 0.035–0.35 |
| Concrete (heavy brush asphalts or eroded by sharp material), Brick | 0.5 | 0.02 |
| Concrete | 0.3–3.0 | 0.012–0.12 |
| Wood Stave | 0.2–0.9 | 5–23 |
| Galvanized metals (normal finish), Cast iron (coated and uncoated) | 0.15–0.26 | 0.006–0.010 |
| Asphalted Cast Iron | 0.12 | 0.0048 |
| Concrete (new, or fairly new, smooth) | 0.1 | 0.004 |
| Steel Pipes, Galvanized metals (smooth finish), Concrete (new, unusually smooth, with smooth joints), Asbestos cement, Flexible straight rubber pipe (with smooth bore) | 0.025–0.045 | 0.001–0.0018 |
| Commercial or Welded Steel, Wrought Iron | 0.045 | 0.0018 |
| PVC, Brass, Copper, Glass, other drawn tubing | 0.0015–0.0025 | 0.00006–0.0001 |

Values used in calculating friction loss in ducts (for, e.g., air) are:

Surface Roughness ε (for air ducts)
| Material | mm | in |
|---|---|---|
| Flexible Duct (wires exposed) | 3.00 | 0.120 |
| Flexible Duct (wires covered) | 0.90 | 0.036 |
| Galvanized Steel | 0.15 | 0.006 |
| PVC, Stainless Steel, Aluminum, Black Iron | 0.05 | 0.0018 |

== Calculating friction loss ==
=== Hagen–Poiseuille Equation ===
Laminar flow is encountered in practice with very viscous fluids, such as motor oil, flowing through small-diameter tubes, at low velocity. Friction loss under conditions of laminar flow follow the Hagen–Poiseuille equation, which is an exact solution to the Navier-Stokes equations. For a circular pipe with a fluid of density ρ and viscosity μ, the hydraulic slope S can be expressed

$$S = \frac{64}{\mathrm{Re}} \frac{V^2}{2gD} = \frac{64\nu}{2g} \frac{V}{D^2}$$

In laminar flow (that is, with Re < ~2000), the hydraulic slope is proportional to the flow velocity.

=== Darcy–Weisbach Equation ===
In many practical engineering applications, the fluid flow is more rapid, therefore turbulent rather than laminar. Under turbulent flow, the friction loss is found to be roughly proportional to the square of the flow velocity and inversely proportional to the pipe diameter, that is, the friction loss follows the phenomenological Darcy–Weisbach equation in which the hydraulic slope S can be expressed

$$S = f_D \frac{ 1 }{ 2g } \frac{V^2}{D}$$

where we have introduced the Darcy friction factor f_{D} (but see Confusion with the Fanning friction factor);

f_{D} = Darcy friction factor

Note that the value of this dimensionless factor depends on the pipe diameter D and the roughness of the pipe surface ε. Furthermore, it varies as well with the flow velocity V and on the physical properties of the fluid (usually cast together into the Reynolds number Re). Thus, the friction loss is not precisely proportional to the flow velocity squared, nor to the inverse of the pipe diameter: the friction factor takes account of the remaining dependency on these parameters.

From experimental measurements, the general features of the variation of f_{D} are, for fixed relative roughness ε / D and for Reynolds number Re = V D / ν > ~2000, (Note: See Moody chart)

- With relative roughness ε / D < 10^{−6}, f_{D} declines in value with increasing Re in an approximate power law, with one order of magnitude change in f_{D} over four orders of magnitude in Re. This is called the "smooth pipe" regime, where the flow is turbulent but not sensitive to the roughness features of the pipe (because the vortices are much larger than those features).
- At higher roughness, with increasing Reynolds number Re, f_{D} climbs from its smooth pipe value, approaching an asymptote that itself varies logarithmically with the relative roughness ε / D; this regime is called "rough pipe" flow.
- The point of departure from smooth flow occurs at a Reynolds number roughly inversely proportional to the value of the relative roughness: the higher the relative roughness, the lower the Re of departure. The range of Re and ε / D between smooth pipe flow and rough pipe flow is labeled "transitional". In this region, the measurements of Nikuradse show a decline in the value of f_{D} with Re, before approaching its asymptotic value from below, although Moody chose not to follow those data in his chart, which is based on the Colebrook–White equation.
- At values of 2000 < Re < 4000, there is a critical zone of flow, a transition from laminar to turbulence, where the value of f_{D} increases from its laminar value of 64 / Re to its smooth pipe value. In this regime, the fluid flow is found to be unstable, with vortices appearing and disappearing within the flow over time.
- The entire dependence of f_{D} on the pipe diameter D is subsumed into the Reynolds number Re and the relative roughness ε / D, likewise the entire dependence on fluid properties density ρ and viscosity μ is subsumed into the Reynolds number Re. This is called scaling. (Note: See Reynolds number)

The experimentally measured values of f_{D} are fit to reasonable accuracy by the (recursive) Colebrook–White equation, depicted graphically in the Moody chart which plots friction factor f_{D} versus Reynolds number Re for selected values of relative roughness ε / D.

=== Calculating friction loss for water in a pipe ===
Water friction loss ("hydraulic slope") S versus flow Q for given ANSI Sch. 40 NPT PVC pipe, roughness height ε = 1.5 μm

In a design problem, one may select pipe for a particular hydraulic slope S based on the candidate pipe's diameter D and its roughness ε. With these quantities as inputs, the friction factor f_{D} can be expressed in closed form in the Colebrook–White equation or other fitting function, and the flow volume Q and flow velocity V can be calculated therefrom.

In the case of water (ρ = 1 g/cc, μ = 1 g/m/s) flowing through a 12-inch (300 mm) Schedule-40 PVC pipe (ε = 0.0015 mm, D = 11.938 in.), a hydraulic slope S = 0.01 (1%) is reached at a flow rate Q = 157 lps (liters per second), or at a velocity V = 2.17 m/s (meters per second). The following table gives Reynolds number Re, Darcy friction factor f_{D}, flow rate Q, and velocity V such that hydraulic slope S = h_{f} / L = 0.01, for a variety of nominal pipe (NPS) sizes.

Volumetric Flow Q where Hydraulic Slope S is 0.01, for selected Nominal Pipe Sizes (NPS) in PVC
| NPS | | D | S | Re | f_{D} | Q | | V | |
| in | mm | in | S | Re | f_{D} | gpm | lps | ft/s | m/s |
|---|---|---|---|---|---|---|---|---|---|
| 1/2 | 15 | 0.622 | 0.01 | 4467 | 5.08 | 0.9 | 0.055 | 0.928 | 0.283 |
| 3/4 | 20 | 0.824 | 0.01 | 7301 | 5.45 | 2 | 0.120 | 1.144 | 0.349 |
| 1 | 25 | 1.049 | 0.01 | 11090 | 5.76 | 3.8 | 0.232 | 1.366 | 0.416 |
| 1 1/2 | 40 | 1.610 | 0.01 | 23121 | 6.32 | 12 | 0.743 | 1.855 | 0.565 |
| 2 | 50 | 2.067 | 0.01 | 35360 | 6.64 | 24 | 1.458 | 2.210 | 0.674 |
| 3 | 75 | 3.068 | 0.01 | 68868 | 7.15 | 70 | 4.215 | 2.899 | 0.884 |
| 4 | 100 | 4.026 | 0.01 | 108615 | 7.50 | 144 | 8.723 | 3.485 | 1.062 |
| 6 | 150 | 6.065 | 0.01 | 215001 | 8.03 | 430 | 26.013 | 4.579 | 1.396 |
| 8 | 200 | 7.981 | 0.01 | 338862 | 8.39 | 892 | 53.951 | 5.484 | 1.672 |
| 10 | 250 | 10.020 | 0.01 | 493357 | 8.68 | 1631 | 98.617 | 6.360 | 1.938 |
| 12 | 300 | 11.938 | 0.01 | 658254 | 8.90 | 2592 | 156.765 | 7.122 | 2.171 |

Note that the cited sources recommend that flow velocity be kept below 5 feet / second (~1.5 m/s).

Also note that the given f_{D} in this table is actually a quantity adopted by the NFPA and the industry, known as C, which has the customary units psi/(100 gpm^{2}ft) and can be calculated using the following relation:

$$\Delta P_f' = CQ'^2L'$$

where $\Delta P_f'$ is the pressure in psi, $Q'$ is the flow in 100gpm and $L'$ is the length of the pipe in 100ft

=== Calculating friction loss for air in a duct ===
A graphical depiction of the relationship between Δp / L, the pressure loss per unit length of pipe, versus flow volume Q, for a range of choices for pipe diameter D, for air at standard temperature and pressure. Units are SI. Lines of constant Re√f_{D} are also shown.

Friction loss takes place as a gas, say air, flows through duct work. The difference in the character of the flow from the case of water in a pipe stems from the differing Reynolds number Re and the roughness of the duct.

The friction loss is customarily given as pressure loss for a given duct length, Δp / L, in units of (US) inches of water for 100 feet or (SI) kg / m^{2} / s^{2}.

For specific choices of duct material, and assuming air at standard temperature and pressure (STP), standard charts can be used to calculate the expected friction loss. The chart exhibited in this section can be used to graphically determine the required diameter of duct to be installed in an application where the volume of flow is determined and where the goal is to keep the pressure loss per unit length of duct S below some target value in all portions of the system under study. First, select the desired pressure loss Δp / L, say 1 kg / m^{2} / s^{2} (0.12 in H_{2}O per 100 ft) on the vertical axis (ordinate). Next scan horizontally to the needed flow volume Q, say 1 m^{3} / s (2000 cfm): the choice of duct with diameter D = 0.5 m (20 in.) will result in a pressure loss rate Δp / L less than the target value. Note in passing that selecting a duct with diameter D = 0.6 m (24 in.) will result in a loss Δp / L of 0.02 kg / m^{2} / s^{2} (0.02 in H_{2}O per 100 ft), illustrating the great gains in blower efficiency to be achieved by using modestly larger ducts.

The following table gives flow rate Q such that friction loss per unit length Δp / L (SI kg / m^{2} / s^{2}) is 0.082, 0.245, and 0.816, respectively, for a variety of nominal duct sizes. The three values chosen for friction loss correspond to, in US units inch water column per 100 feet, 0.01, .03, and 0.1. Note that, in approximation, for a given value of flow volume, a step up in duct size (say from 100mm to 120mm) will reduce the friction loss by a factor of 3.

Volumetric Flow Q of air at STP where friction loss per unit length Δp / L (SI kg / m^{2} / s^{2}) is, resp., 0.082, 0.245, and 0.816., for selected Nominal Duct Sizes in smooth duct (ε = 50μm.)
| Δp / L | | 0.082 | | 0.245 | | 0.816 | |
| kg / m^{2} / s^{2} | | 0.082 | | 0.245 | | 0.816 | |
| Duct size | | Q | | Q | | Q | |
| in | mm | cfm | m^{3}/s | cfm | m^{3}/s | cfm | m^{3}/s |
| 2 1/2 | 63 | 3 | 0.0012 | 5 | 0.0024 | 10 | 0.0048 |
| 3 1/4 | 80 | 5 | 0.0024 | 10 | 0.0046 | 20 | 0.0093 |
| 4 | 100 | 10 | 0.0045 | 18 | 0.0085 | 36 | 0.0171 |
| 5 | 125 | 18 | 0.0083 | 33 | 0.0157 | 66 | 0.0313 |
| 6 | 160 | 35 | 0.0163 | 65 | 0.0308 | 129 | 0.0611 |
| 8 | 200 | 64 | 0.0301 | 119 | 0.0563 | 236 | 0.1114 |
| 10 | 250 | 117 | 0.0551 | 218 | 0.1030 | 430 | 0.2030 |
| 12 | 315 | 218 | 0.1031 | 407 | 0.1919 | 799 | 0.3771 |
| 16 | 400 | 416 | 0.1965 | 772 | 0.3646 | 1513 | 0.7141 |
| 20 | 500 | 759 | 0.3582 | 1404 | 0.6627 | 2743 | 1.2945 |
| 24 | 630 | 1411 | 0.6657 | 2603 | 1.2285 | 5072 | 2.3939 |
| 32 | 800 | 2673 | 1.2613 | 4919 | 2.3217 | 9563 | 4.5131 |
| 40 | 1000 | 4847 | 2.2877 | 8903 | 4.2018 | 17270 | 8.1504 |
| 48 | 1200 | 7876 | 3.7172 | 14442 | 6.8161 | 27969 | 13.2000 |

Note that, for the chart and table presented here, flow is in the turbulent, smooth pipe domain, with R* < 5 in all cases.
