= Fanning friction factor =

Ratio between local shear stress and bulk dynamic pressure within a flow

The Fanning friction factor (named after American engineer John T. Fanning) is a dimensionless number used as a local parameter in continuum mechanics calculations. It is defined as the ratio between the local shear stress and the local flow kinetic energy density:

$$f = \frac {\tau}{q}$$

where

f is the local Fanning friction factor (dimensionless);
τ is the local shear stress (units of pascals (Pa) = N/m^{2}, or pounds per square foot (psf) = lbf/ft^{2});
q is the bulk dynamic pressure (Pa or psf), given by:

$$q = \frac {1}{2} \rho u^2$$

ρ is the density of the fluid (kg/m^{3} or lbm/ft^{3})
u is the bulk flow velocity (m/s or ft/s)

In particular the shear stress at the wall can, in turn, be related to the pressure loss by multiplying the wall shear stress by the wall area ( $2 \pi R L$ for a pipe with circular cross section) and dividing by the cross-sectional flow area ( $\pi R^2$ for a pipe with circular cross section). Thus $\Delta P = f \frac{2L}{R} q = f \frac{L}{R} \rho u^2$

== Fanning friction factor formula ==
Fanning friction factor for tube flow

This friction factor is one-fourth of the Darcy friction factor, so attention must be paid to note which one of these is meant in the "friction factor" chart or equation consulted. Of the two, the Fanning friction factor is the more commonly used by chemical engineers and those following the British convention.

The formulas below may be used to obtain the Fanning friction factor for common applications.

The Darcy friction factor can also be expressed as

$f _ {D} = \frac{8 \bar \tau}{\rho \bar u ^ 2}$

where:

- $\tau$ is the shear stress at the wall
- $\rho$ is the density of the fluid
- $\bar u$ is the flow velocity averaged on the flow cross section

=== For laminar flow in a round tube ===
From the chart, it is evident that the friction factor is never zero, even for smooth pipes because of some roughness at the microscopic level.

The friction factor for laminar flow of Newtonian fluids in round tubes is often taken to be:

$f= \frac{16}{Re}$

where Re is the Reynolds number of the flow.

For a square channel the value used is:

$f = \frac{14.227}{Re}$

=== For turbulent flow in a round tube ===
==== Hydraulically smooth piping ====
Blasius developed an expression of friction factor in 1913 for the flow in the regime $2100<Re<10^5$.

$f=\frac{0.0791}{Re^{0.25}}$

Koo introduced another explicit formula in 1933 for a turbulent flow in region of $10^4<Re<10^7$

$f=0.0014+\frac{0.125}{Re^{0.32}}$

==== Pipes/tubes of general roughness ====
When the pipes have certain roughness $\frac{\epsilon}{D}<0.05$, this factor must be taken in account when the Fanning friction factor is calculated. The relationship between pipe roughness and Fanning friction factor was developed by Haaland (1983) under flow conditions of $4 \centerdot10^4<Re<10^7$

$\frac{1}{\sqrt{f}}=-3.6\log_{10}\left [ \frac{6.9}{Re}+\left ( \frac{\epsilon/D}{3.7} \right )^{10/9} \right ]$

where

- $\epsilon$ is the roughness of the inner surface of the pipe (dimension of length)
- D is inner pipe diameter;

The Swamee–Jain equation is used to solve directly for the Darcy–Weisbach friction factor f for a full-flowing circular pipe. It is an approximation of the implicit Colebrook–White equation.

$$f = \frac{0.0625}{\left[\log\left (\frac{\varepsilon/D}{3.7} + \frac{5.74}{\mathrm{Re}^{0.9}}\right)\right]^2}$$

==== Fully rough conduits ====
As the roughness extends into turbulent core, the Fanning friction factor becomes independent of fluid viscosity at large Reynolds numbers, as illustrated by Nikuradse and Reichert (1943) for the flow in region of $Re>10^4;\frac{k}{D}>0.01$. The equation below has been modified from the original format which was developed for Darcy friction factor by a factor of $\frac{1}{4}$

$\frac{1}{\sqrt{f}}=2.28-4.0\log_{10}\left ( \frac{k}{D} \right )$

==== General expression ====
For the turbulent flow regime, the relationship between the Fanning friction factor and the Reynolds number is more complex and is governed by the Colebrook equation which is implicit in $f$:

$${1 \over \sqrt{\mathit{f}}}= -4.0 \log_{10} \left(\frac{\frac{\varepsilon}{d}}{3.7} + {\frac{1.255}{Re \sqrt{\mathit{f} } } } \right)  , \text{turbulent flow}$$

Various explicit approximations of the related Darcy friction factor have been developed for turbulent flow.

Stuart W. Churchill developed a formula that covers the friction factor for both laminar and turbulent flow. This was originally produced to describe the Moody chart, which plots the Darcy-Weisbach Friction factor against Reynolds number. The Darcy Weisbach Formula $f_D$, also called Moody friction factor, is 4 times the Fanning friction factor $f$ and so a factor of $\frac{1}{4}$ has been applied to produce the formula given below.

- Re, Reynolds number (unitless);
- ε, roughness of the inner surface of the pipe (dimension of length);
- D, inner pipe diameter;
- ln is the Natural logarithm;
- Here, $f$ is not the Darcy-Weisbach Friction factor $f_D$, $f$ is 4 times lower than $f_D$;

$$f = 2 \left(
\left( \frac {8} {Re} \right) ^ {12}
+ \left( A+B \right) ^ {-1.5}
\right) ^ {\frac {1} {12} }$$
$$A = \left( 2.457 \ln \left( \left( \left( \frac {7} {Re} \right) ^ {0.9} + 0.27 \frac {\varepsilon} {D} \right)^ {-1}\right) \right) ^ {16}$$
$$B = \left( \frac {37530} {Re} \right) ^ {16}$$

==== Flows in non-circular conduits ====
Due to geometry of non-circular conduits, the Fanning friction factor can be estimated from algebraic expressions above by using hydraulic radius $R_H$ when calculating for Reynolds number $Re_H$

== Application ==
The friction head can be related to the pressure loss due to friction by dividing the pressure loss by the product of the acceleration due to gravity and the density of the fluid. Accordingly, the relationship between the friction head and the Fanning friction factor is:

$$\Delta h = f \frac{u^2 L}{gR} = 2f \frac{u^2 L}{gD}$$

where:

- $\Delta h$ is the friction loss (in head) of the pipe.
- $f$ is the Fanning friction factor of the pipe.
- $u$ is the flow velocity in the pipe.
- $L$ is the length of pipe.
- $g$ is the local acceleration of gravity.
- $D$ is the pipe diameter.
