= Darcy friction factor formulae =

Equations for calculations of the Darcy friction factor

In fluid dynamics, the Darcy friction factor formulae are equations that allow the calculation of the Darcy friction factor, a dimensionless quantity used in the Darcy–Weisbach equation, for the description of friction losses in pipe flow as well as open-channel flow.

The Darcy friction factor is also known as the Darcy–Weisbach friction factor, resistance coefficient or simply friction factor; by definition it is four times larger than the Fanning friction factor.

== Notation ==
In this article, the following conventions and definitions are to be understood:

- The Reynolds number Re is taken to be Re = V D / ν, where V is the mean velocity of fluid flow, D is the pipe diameter, and where ν is the kinematic viscosity μ / ρ, with μ the fluid's Dynamic viscosity, and ρ the fluid's density.
- The pipe's relative roughness ε / D, where ε is the pipe's effective roughness height and D the pipe (inside) diameter.
- f stands for the Darcy friction factor. Its value depends on the flow's Reynolds number Re and on the pipe's relative roughness ε / D.
- The log function is understood to be base-10 (as is customary in engineering fields): if x = log(y), then y = 10^{x}.
- The ln function is understood to be base-e: if x = ln(y), then y = e^{x}.

== Flow regime ==
Which friction factor formula may be applicable depends upon the type of flow that exists:

- Laminar flow
- Transition between laminar and turbulent flow
- Fully turbulent flow in smooth conduits
- Fully turbulent flow in rough conduits
- Free surface flow.

=== Transition flow ===
Transition (neither fully laminar nor fully turbulent) flow occurs in the range of Reynolds numbers between 2300 and 4000. The value of the Darcy friction factor is subject to large uncertainties in this flow regime.

=== Turbulent flow in smooth conduits ===
The Blasius correlation is the simplest equation for computing the Darcy friction factor. Because the Blasius correlation has no term for pipe roughness, it is valid only to smooth pipes. However, the Blasius correlation is sometimes used in rough pipes because of its simplicity. The Blasius correlation is valid up to the Reynolds number 100000.

=== Turbulent flow in rough conduits ===
The Darcy friction factor for fully turbulent flow (Reynolds number greater than 4000) in rough conduits can be modeled by the Colebrook–White equation.

=== Free surface flow ===
The last formula in the Colebrook equation section of this article is for free surface flow. The approximations elsewhere in this article are not applicable for this type of flow.

== Choosing a formula ==
Before choosing a formula it is worth knowing that in the paper on the Moody chart, Moody stated the accuracy is about ±5% for smooth pipes and ±10% for rough pipes. If more than one formula is applicable in the flow regime under consideration, the choice of formula may be influenced by one or more of the following:

- Required accuracy
- Speed of computation required
- Available computational technology:
  - calculator (minimize keystrokes)
  - spreadsheet (single-cell formula)
  - programming/scripting language (subroutine).

=== Colebrook–White equation ===
The empirical Colebrook–White equation (or Colebrook equation) expresses the Darcy friction factor f as a function of Reynolds number Re and pipe relative roughness ε / D_{h}, fitting the data of experimental studies of turbulent flow in smooth and rough pipes. The equation can be used to (iteratively) solve for the Darcy–Weisbach friction factor f.

For a conduit flowing completely full of fluid at Reynolds numbers greater than 4000, it is expressed as:

$$\frac{1}{\sqrt{f}}= -2 \log \left( \frac { \varepsilon} {3.7 D_\mathrm{h}} + \frac {2.51} {\mathrm{Re} \sqrt{f}} \right)$$

or

$$\frac{1}{\sqrt{f}}= -2 \log \left( \frac{\varepsilon}{14.8 R_\mathrm{h}} + \frac{2.51}{\mathrm{Re}\sqrt{f}} \right)$$

where:

- Hydraulic diameter, $D_\mathrm{h}$ (m, ft) – For fluid-filled, circular conduits, $D_\mathrm{h}$ = D = inside diameter
- Hydraulic radius, $R_\mathrm{h}$ (m, ft) – For fluid-filled, circular conduits, $R_\mathrm{h}$ = D/4 = (inside diameter)/4

Note: Some sources use a constant of 3.71 in the denominator for the roughness term in the first equation above.

=== Solving ===
The Colebrook equation is usually solved numerically due to its implicit nature. Recently, the Lambert W function has been employed to obtain an exact solution in an explicit reformulation of the Colebrook equation.

$x=\frac{1}{\sqrt{f}}, b=\frac{\varepsilon}{14.8R_h}, a= \frac{2.51}{Re}$

$x=-2\log(ax+b)$

or

$10^{-\frac{x}{2}}= ax+b$

$p=10^{-\frac{1}{2}}$

will get:

$$p^x = ax + b$$

$$x = -\frac{W\left(-\frac{\ln p}{a}\,p^{-\frac{b}{a}}\right)}{\ln p} - \frac{b}{a}$$

then:

$$f = \frac{1}{\left(\dfrac{2W\left(\frac{\ln 10}{2a}\,10^{\frac{b}{2a}}\right)}{\ln 10} - \dfrac{b}{a}\right)^2}$$

=== Expanded forms ===
Additional, mathematically equivalent forms of the Colebrook equation are:

$\frac{1}{\sqrt{f}}= 1.7384\ldots -2 \log \left( \frac { 2 \varepsilon} {D_\mathrm{h}} + \frac {18.574} {\mathrm{Re} \sqrt{f}} \right)$

where:

1.7384... = 2 log (2 × 3.7) = 2 log (7.4)
18.574 = 2.51 × 3.7 × 2

and

$$\frac{1}{\sqrt{f}}= 1.1364\ldots + 2 \log\left (D_\mathrm{h} / \varepsilon\right) -2 \log \left( 1 + \frac { 9.287} {\mathrm{Re} (\varepsilon/D_\mathrm{h}) \sqrt{f}} \right)$$
or
$\frac{1}{\sqrt{f}}= 1.1364\ldots -2 \log \left( \frac {\varepsilon}{D_\mathrm{h}} + \frac {9.287} {\mathrm{Re} \sqrt{f}} \right)$

where:

1.1364... = 1.7384... − 2 log (2) = 2 log (7.4) − 2 log (2) = 2 log (3.7)
9.287 = 18.574 / 2 = 2.51 × 3.7.

The additional equivalent forms above assume that the constants 3.7 and 2.51 in the formula at the top of this section are exact. The constants are probably values which were rounded by Colebrook during his curve fitting; but they are effectively treated as exact when comparing (to several decimal places) results from explicit formulae (such as those found elsewhere in this article) to the friction factor computed via Colebrook's implicit equation.

Equations similar to the additional forms above (with the constants rounded to fewer decimal places, or perhaps shifted slightly to minimize overall rounding errors) may be found in various references. It may be helpful to note that they are essentially the same equation.

=== Free surface flow ===
Another form of the Colebrook-White equation exists for free surfaces. Such a condition may exist in a pipe that is flowing partially full of fluid. For free surface flow:

$$\frac{1}{\sqrt{f}} = -2 \log \left(\frac{\varepsilon}{12R_\mathrm{h}} + \frac{2.51}{\mathrm{Re}\sqrt{f}}\right).$$

The above equation is valid only for turbulent flow. Another approach for estimating f in free surface flows, which is valid under all the flow regimes (laminar, transition and turbulent) is the following:

$f=\left ( \frac{24}{Re_h} \right )^{a} \left [ \frac{0.86e^{W(1.35Re_h)}} {Re_h} \right ]^{2(1-a)b} \left \{ \frac{1.34}{\left [ \ln{12.21\left ( \frac{R_h}{\epsilon} \right )} \right ]^2} \right \}^{(1-a)(1-b)}$

where a is:

$a= \frac{1}{1+\left ( \frac{Re_h}{678} \right )^{8.4}}$

and b is:

$b=\frac{1}{1+\left ( \frac{Re_h}{150\left ( \frac{R_h}{\epsilon} \right )} \right )^{1.8}}$

where Re_{h} is Reynolds number where h is the characteristic hydraulic length (hydraulic radius for 1D flows or water depth for 2D flows) and R_{h} is the hydraulic radius (for 1D flows) or the water depth (for 2D flows). The Lambert W function can be calculated as follows:

$W(1.35Re_h)=\ln{1.35Re_h}-\ln{\ln{1.35Re_h}}+\left ( \frac{\ln{\ln{1.35Re_h}}}{\ln{1.35Re_h}} \right )+ \left ( \frac{\ln{[\ln{1.35Re_h}]^2-2\ln{\ln{1.35Re_h}}}}{2[\ln{1.35Re_h}]^2} \right )$

== Approximations of the Colebrook equation ==
=== Haaland equation ===
The Haaland equation was proposed in 1983 by Professor S.E. Haaland of the Norwegian Institute of Technology. It is used to solve directly for the Darcy–Weisbach friction factor f for a full-flowing circular pipe. It is an approximation of the implicit Colebrook–White equation, but the discrepancy from experimental data is well within the accuracy of the data.

The Haaland equation is expressed:

$$\frac{1}{\sqrt {f}} = -1.8 \log \left[ \left( \frac{\varepsilon/D}{3.7} \right)^{1.11} + \frac{6.9}{\mathrm{Re}} \right]$$

=== Swamee–Jain equation ===
The Swamee–Jain equation is used to solve directly for the Darcy–Weisbach friction factor f for a full-flowing circular pipe. It is an approximation of the implicit Colebrook–White equation.

$$f = \frac{0.25}{\left[\log\left (\frac{\varepsilon/D}{3.7} + \frac{5.74}{\mathrm{Re}^{0.9}}\right)\right]^2}$$

=== Serghides's solution ===
Serghides's solution is used to solve directly for the Darcy–Weisbach friction factor f for a full-flowing circular pipe. It is an approximation of the implicit Colebrook–White equation. It was derived using Steffensen's method.

The solution involves calculating three intermediate values and then substituting those values into a final equation.

$$A = -2\log\left( \frac{\varepsilon/D}{3.7} + {12\over \mathrm{Re}}\right)$$

$$B = -2\log \left(\frac{\varepsilon/D}{3.7} + {2.51 A \over \mathrm{Re}}\right)$$

$$C = -2\log \left(\frac{\varepsilon/D}{3.7} + {2.51 B \over \mathrm{Re}}\right)$$

$$\frac{1}{\sqrt{f}} = A - \frac{(B - A)^2}{C - 2B + A}$$

The equation was found to match the Colebrook–White equation within 0.0023% for a test set with a 70-point matrix consisting of ten relative roughness values (in the range 0.00004 to 0.05) by seven Reynolds numbers (2500 to 10^{8}).

=== Goudar–Sonnad equation ===
Goudar equation is the most accurate approximation to solve directly for the Darcy–Weisbach friction factor f for a full-flowing circular pipe. It is an approximation of the implicit Colebrook–White equation. Equation has the following form

$$a = {2 \over \ln(10)}$$
$$b = \frac{\varepsilon/D}{3.7}$$
$$d = {\ln(10)\mathrm{Re}\over 5.02}$$
$$s = {bd + \ln(d)}$$
$$q = {{s}^{s/(s+1)}}$$
$$g = {bd + \ln{d \over q}}$$
$$z = {\ln{q \over g}}$$
$$D_{LA} = z{{g\over {g+1}}}$$
$$D_{CFA} = D_{LA} \left(1 + \frac{z/2}{(g+1)^2+(z/3)(2g-1)}\right)$$
$$\frac{1}{\sqrt {f}} = {a\left[ \ln\left( d / q \right) + D_{CFA} \right] }$$

=== Brkić solution ===
Brkić shows one approximation of the Colebrook equation based on the Lambert W-function

$$S = \ln\frac{\mathrm{Re}}{\mathrm{1.816\ln\frac{1.1\mathrm{Re}}{ \ln\left( 1+1.1\mathrm{Re} \right) }}}$$
$$\frac{1}{\sqrt {f}} = -2\log \left(\frac{\varepsilon/D}{3.71} + {2.18 S \over \mathrm{Re}}\right)$$

The equation was found to match the Colebrook–White equation within 3.15%.

=== Brkić-Praks solution ===
Brkić and Praks show one approximation of the Colebrook equation based on the Wright $\omega$-function, a cognate of the Lambert W-function

$$\displaystyle\frac{1}{\sqrt{f}}\approx 0.8686\cdot \left[ B-C+\displaystyle\frac{1.038\cdot C}{\mathrm{0.332+}\,x}\right] \,$$
$A\approx \displaystyle \frac{Re\cdot \epsilon/D }{8.0884}$, $B\approx \mathrm{ln}\,\left( Re\right) -0.7794$, $C=$$\mathrm{ln}\,\left( x\right)$, and $x=A+B$

The equation was found to match the Colebrook–White equation within 0.0497%.

=== Praks-Brkić solution ===
Praks and Brkić show one approximation of the Colebrook equation based on the Wright $\omega$-function, a cognate of the Lambert W-function

$$\displaystyle\frac{1}{\sqrt{f}}\approx 0.8685972\cdot \left[ B-C+\displaystyle\frac{C}{x-0.5588\cdot C+1.2079}\, \right]$$
$A\approx \displaystyle \frac{Re\cdot \epsilon/D }{8.0897}$, $B\approx \mathrm{ln}\,\left( Re\right) -0.779626$, $C=$$\mathrm{ln}\,\left( x\right)$, and $x=A+B$

The equation was found to match the Colebrook–White equation within 0.0012%.

=== Niazkar's solution ===
Since Serghides's solution was found to be one of the most accurate approximation of the implicit Colebrook–White equation, Niazkar modified the Serghides's solution to solve directly for the Darcy–Weisbach friction factor f for a full-flowing circular pipe.

Niazkar's solution is shown in the following:

$$A = -2\log\left( \frac{\varepsilon/D}{3.7} + {4.5547\over \mathrm{Re^{0.8784}}}\right)$$

$$B = -2\log \left(\frac{\varepsilon/D}{3.7} + {2.51 A \over \mathrm{Re}}\right)$$

$$C = -2\log \left(\frac{\varepsilon/D}{3.7} + {2.51 B \over \mathrm{Re}}\right)$$

$$\frac{1}{\sqrt{f}} = A - \frac{(B - A)^2}{C - 2B + A}$$

Niazkar's solution was found to be the most accurate correlation based on a comparative analysis conducted in the literature among 42 different explicit equations for estimating Colebrook friction factor.

=== Blasius correlations ===
Early approximations for smooth pipes by Paul Richard Heinrich Blasius in terms of the Darcy–Weisbach friction factor are given in one article of 1913:

$$f = 0.3164 \mathrm{Re}^{-{1 \over 4}}$$.

Johann Nikuradse in 1932 proposed that this corresponds to a power law correlation for the fluid velocity profile.

Mishra and Gupta in 1979 proposed a correction for curved or helically coiled tubes, taking into account the equivalent curve radius, R_{c}:

$$f = 0.316 \mathrm{Re}^{-{1 \over 4}} + 0.0075\sqrt{\frac {D}{2 R_c}}$$,

with,

$$R_c = R\left[1 + \left(\frac{H}{2 \pi R} \right)^2\right]$$

where f is a function of:

- Pipe diameter, D (m, ft)
- Curve radius, R (m, ft)
- Helicoidal pitch, H (m, ft)
- Reynolds number, Re (dimensionless)

valid for:

- Re_{tr} < Re < 10^{5}
- 6.7 < 2R_{c}/D < 346.0
- 0 < H/D < 25.4

=== Swamee equation ===
The Swamee equation is used to solve directly for the Darcy–Weisbach friction factor (f) for a full-flowing circular pipe for all flow regimes (laminar, transitional, turbulent). It is an exact solution for the Hagen–Poiseuille equation in the laminar flow regime and an approximation of the implicit Colebrook–White equation in the turbulent regime with a maximum deviation of less than 2.38% over the specified range. Additionally, it provides a smooth transition between the laminar and turbulent regimes to be valid as a full-range equation, 0 < Re < 10^{8}.

$$f = \left \lbrace \left(\frac{64}{\mathrm{Re}}\right)^{8} + 9.5 \left[ \ln \left(\frac{\varepsilon}{{3.7}{D}} + \frac{5.74}{\mathrm{Re}^{0.9}} \right) - \left(\frac{2500}{\mathrm{Re}}\right)^{6}\right]^{-16} \right \rbrace ^{\frac{1}{8}}$$

=== Table of Approximations ===
The following table lists historical approximations to the Colebrook–White relation for pressure-driven flow. Churchill equation (1977) is the only equation that can be evaluated for very slow flow (Reynolds number < 1), but the Cheng (2008), and Bellos et al. (2018) equations also return an approximately correct value for friction factor in the laminar flow region (Reynolds number < 2300). All of the others are for transitional and turbulent flow only.

Table of Colebrook equation approximations
Equation	Author	Year	Range	Ref
$f = 0.0055 \left[1 + \left(2 \times10^4 \cdot\frac{\varepsilon}{D} + \frac{10^6}{\mathrm{Re}} \right)^\frac{1}{3}\right]$	Moody	1947	$4000 \le \mathrm{Re} \le 5 \times 10^{8}$ $0 \le \varepsilon/D \le 0.01$	
$f = 0.094 \left(\frac{\varepsilon}{D}\right)^{0.225} + 0.53 \left(\frac{\varepsilon}{D}\right) + 88 \left(\frac{\varepsilon}{D}\right)^{0.44} \cdot {\mathrm{Re}}^{-{\Psi}}$ where $$\Psi = 1.62\left(\frac{\varepsilon}{D}\right)^{0.134}$$	Wood	1966	$4000 \le \mathrm{Re} \le 5 \times 10^{7}$ $0.00001 \le \varepsilon/D \le 0.04$	
$\frac{1}{\sqrt{f}} = -2 \log\left (\frac{\varepsilon/D}{3.715} + \frac{15}{\mathrm{Re}}\right)$	Eck	1973		
$f = \frac{0.25}{\left[\log\left (\frac{\varepsilon/D}{3.7} + \frac{5.74}{\mathrm{Re}^{0.9}}\right)\right]^2}$	Swamee and Jain	1976	$5000 \le \mathrm{Re} \le 10^{8}$ $0.000001 \le \varepsilon/D \le 0.05$	
$\frac{1}{\sqrt{f}} = -2 \log\left ( \frac{\varepsilon/D}{3.71} + \left(\frac{7}{\mathrm{Re}}\right)^{0.9}\right)$	Churchill	1973		
$\frac{1}{\sqrt{f}} = -2 \log\left ( \frac{\varepsilon/D}{3.715} + \left(\frac{6.943}{\mathrm{Re}}\right)^{0.9}\right)$	Jain	1976		
$f = 8\left[\left(\frac{8}{\mathrm{Re}}\right)^{12} + \frac{1}{(\Theta_1 + \Theta_2)^{1.5}}\right]^{\frac{1}{12}}$ where $$\Theta_1 = \left[-2.457 \ln\left( \left(\frac{7}{\mathrm{Re}}\right)^{0.9} + 0.27\frac{\varepsilon}{D}\right)\right]^{16}$$ $$\Theta_2 = \left(\frac{37530}{\mathrm{Re}}\right)^{16}$$	Churchill	1977	All flow regimes	
$\frac{1}{\sqrt{f}} = -2 \log\left [\frac{\varepsilon/D}{3.7065} - \frac{5.0452}{\mathrm{Re}} \log\left(\frac{1}{2.8257} \left( \frac{\varepsilon}{D} \right)^{1.1098} + \frac{5.8506}{\mathrm{Re}^{0.8981}} \right) \right]$	Chen	1979	$4000 \le \mathrm{Re} \le 4 \times 10^{8}$	
$\frac{1}{\sqrt{f}} = 1.8\log\left[ \frac{\mathrm{Re}}{0.135\mathrm{Re}( \varepsilon / D ) +6.5}\right]$	Round	1980		
$\frac{1}{\sqrt{f}} = -2 \log \left(\frac{\varepsilon/D}{3.7} + \frac{4.518\log\left(\frac{\mathrm{Re}}{7}\right)} {\mathrm{Re} \left(1 + \frac{\mathrm{Re}^{0.52}}{29} ( \varepsilon / D )^{0.7} \right)} \right)$	Barr	1981		
$\frac{1}{\sqrt{f}} = -2 \log \left [\frac{\varepsilon/D}{3.7} - \frac{5.02}{\mathrm{Re}} \log\left(\frac{\varepsilon/D}{3.7} - \frac{5.02}{\mathrm{Re}} \log\left(\frac{\varepsilon/D}{3.7} + \frac{13}{\mathrm{Re}}\right)\right)\right]$ or $\frac{1}{\sqrt{f}} = -2 \log\left [\frac{\varepsilon/D}{3.7} - \frac{5.02}{\mathrm{Re}} \log\left(\frac{\varepsilon/D}{3.7} + \frac{13}{\mathrm{Re}}\right)\right]$	Zigrang and Sylvester	1982		
$\frac{1}{\sqrt{f}} = -1.8 \log \left[\left(\frac{\varepsilon/D}{3.7}\right)^{1.11} + \frac{6.9}{\mathrm{Re}}\right]$	Haaland	1983		
$\frac{1}{\sqrt{f}} = \Psi_1 - \frac{(\Psi_2-\Psi_1)^{2}}{\Psi_3-2\Psi_2+\Psi_1}$ or $\frac{1}{\sqrt{f}} = 4.781 - \frac{(\Psi_1-4.781)^{2}}{\Psi_2-2\Psi_1+4.781}$ where $$\Psi_1 = -2\log\left(\frac{\varepsilon/D}{3.7} + \frac{12}{\mathrm{Re}}\right)$$ $$\Psi_2 = -2\log\left(\frac{\varepsilon/D}{3.7} + \frac{2.51\Psi_1}{\mathrm{Re}}\right)$$ $$\Psi_3 = -2\log\left(\frac{\varepsilon/D}{3.7} + \frac{2.51\Psi_2}{\mathrm{Re}}\right)$$	Serghides	1984		
$$A=0.11\left ( \frac{68}{Re}+ \frac \varepsilon {D} \right )^{0.25}$$ if $A\geq 0.018$ then $f=A$ and if $A<0.018$ then $f=0.0028+0.85A$	Tsal	1989		
$\frac{1}{\sqrt{f}} = -2 \log\left(\frac{\varepsilon/D}{3.7} + \frac{95}{\mathrm{Re}^{0.983}} - \frac{96.82}{\mathrm{Re}}\right)$	Manadilli	1997	$4000 \le \mathrm{Re} \le 10^{8}$ $0 \le \varepsilon/D \le 0.05$	
$\frac{1}{\sqrt{f}} = -2 \log\left \lbrace \frac{\varepsilon/D}{3.7065} - \frac{5.0272}{\mathrm{Re}} \log\left[ \frac{\varepsilon/D}{3.827} - \frac{4.657}{\mathrm{Re}} \log\left( \left(\frac{\varepsilon/D}{7.7918}\right)^{0.9924} + \left(\frac{5.3326}{208.815 + \mathrm{Re}} \right)^{0.9345} \right) \right] \right\rbrace$	Romeo, Royo, Monzon	2002		
$\frac{1}{\sqrt{f}} = 0.8686 \ln\left[ \frac{0.4587\mathrm{Re}}{(S-0.31)^{\frac{S}{(S+1)}}} \right]$ where: $$S = 0.124\mathrm{Re} \frac{\varepsilon}{D} + \ln (0.4587\mathrm{Re})$$	Goudar, Sonnad	2006		
$\frac{1}{\sqrt{f}} = 0.8686 \ln\left[ \frac{0.4587\mathrm{Re}}{(S-0.31)^{\frac{S}{(S+0.9633)}}} \right]$ where: $$S = 0.124\mathrm{Re} \frac{\varepsilon}{D} + \ln (0.4587\mathrm{Re})$$	Vatankhah, Kouchakzadeh	2008		
$\frac{1}{\sqrt{f}} = \alpha - \frac {\alpha + 2\log\left(\frac{\Beta}{\mathrm{Re}}\right)}{1 + \frac{2.18}{\Beta}}$ where $$\alpha = \frac{ 0.744\ln(\mathrm{Re}) - 1.41 } { 1+ 1.32\sqrt{ \varepsilon / D } }$$ $$\Beta = \frac{\varepsilon/D}{3.7}\mathrm{Re} + 2.51\alpha$$	Buzzelli	2008		
$\frac {1} {f}=\left ( \frac{Re}{64} \right )^a \left ( 1.8\log \frac {Re} {6.8} \right )^{2(1-a)b} \left ( 2.0\log \frac {3.7D} {\epsilon} \right )^{2(1-a)(1-b)}$ where $a= \frac{1}{1+\left ( \frac{Re}{2720} \right )^{9}}$ $b= \frac{1}{1+\left ( \frac{Re}{160 \frac {D} {\epsilon}} \right )^{2}}$	Cheng	2008	All flow regimes	
$f = \frac{6.4}{(\ln(\mathrm{Re}) -\ln(1+.01\mathrm{Re}\frac{\varepsilon}{D}(1+10\sqrt{\frac{\varepsilon}{D}})))^{2.4}}$	Avci, Kargoz	2009		
$f = \frac{0.2479 - 0.0000947(7-\log \mathrm{Re})^{4}}{(\log\left(\frac{\varepsilon/D}{3.615} + \frac{7.366}{\mathrm{Re}^{0.9142}}\right))^{2}}$	Evangelides, Papaevangelou, Tzimopoulos	2010		
$f=1.613\left [ \ln \left ( 0.234 \left(\frac{\varepsilon}{D}\right)^{1.1007} -\frac{60.525}{\mathrm{Re}^{1.1105}}+\frac{56.291}{\mathrm{Re}^{1.0712}}\right ) \right ]^{-2}$	Fang	2011		
$f=\left [ -2\log \left ( \frac{2.18\beta}{\mathrm{Re}} + \frac{\varepsilon / D }{3.71}\right ) \right ]^{-2}$ , $\beta =\ln \frac{\mathrm{Re}}{1.816\ln \left ( \frac{1.1Re}{\ln \left ( 1+1.1\mathrm{Re} \right )} \right )}$	Brkić	2011		
$f=1.325474505\log_{e}\left ( A-0.8686068432B\log_{e}\left ( A-0.8784893582B\log_{e}\left ( A+(1.665368035B)^{0.8373492157} \right ) \right ) \right )^{-2}$ where $$A= \frac{\varepsilon/D}{3.7065}$$ $$B= \frac{2.5226}{\mathrm{Re}}$$	S.Alashkar	2012		
$f=\left ( \frac {64} {\mathrm{Re}} \right )^a \left [ 0.75 \ln \left ( \frac {\mathrm{Re}} {5.37} \right ) \right ]^{2(a-1)b} \left [ 0.88 \ln \left ( 3.41\frac {D} {\epsilon} \right ) \right ]^{2(a-1)(1-b)}$ where $a= \frac{1}{1+\left ( \frac{\mathrm{Re}}{2712} \right )^{8.4}}$ $b= \frac{1}{1+\left ( \frac{\mathrm{Re}}{150 \frac {D} {\epsilon}} \right )^{1.8}}$	Bellos, Nalbantis, Tsakiris	2018	All flow regimes	
$\frac{1}{\sqrt{f}} = A - \frac{(B - A)^2}{C - 2B + A}$ where $A = -2\log\left( \frac{\varepsilon/D}{3.7} + {4.5547\over \mathrm{Re}^{0.8784}}\right)$ $B = -2\log \left(\frac{\varepsilon/D}{3.7} + {2.51 A \over \mathrm{Re}}\right)$ $C = -2\log \left(\frac{\varepsilon/D}{3.7} + {2.51 B \over \mathrm{Re}}\right)$	Niazkar	2019		
$f = {\frac{1}{\left(0.8284 \ln \left({\dfrac{\varepsilon/D}{4.913}}+{\dfrac{10.31}{\mathrm{Re}}}\right)\right)^2}}$	Tkachenko, Mileikovskyi	2020	Deviation 5.36%, $2320 \le {\mathrm{Re}} \le 10^9$ $0 \le {\varepsilon/D} \le 0.65$	
$f = \left({\frac{8.128943+A_1}{8.128943 A_0 - 0.86859209 A_1 \ln \left(\dfrac{A_1}{3.7099535 \mathrm{Re}} \right)}}\right)^2$ where $A_0 = -0.79638 \ln \left({\frac{\varepsilon/D}{8.208}}+{\frac{7.3357}{\mathrm{Re}}}\right)$ $A_1 = \mathrm{Re}\left(\varepsilon/D \right) + 9.3120665 A_0$	Tkachenko, Mileikovskyi	2020	Deviation 0.00072%, $2320 \le {\mathrm{Re}} \le 10^9$ $0 \le {\varepsilon/D} \le 0.65$	
