= Moody chart =

Graph used in fluid dynamics

In engineering, the Moody chart or Moody diagram (also Stanton diagram) is a graph in non-dimensional form that relates the Darcy–Weisbach friction factor f_{D}, Reynolds number Re, and surface roughness for fully developed flow in a circular pipe. It can be used to predict pressure drop or flow rate down such a pipe.

Moody diagram showing the Darcy–Weisbach friction factor f_{D} plotted against Reynolds number Re for various relative roughness ε / D

== History ==
In 1944, Lewis Ferry Moody plotted the Darcy–Weisbach friction factor against Reynolds number Re for various values of relative roughness ε / D. This chart became commonly known as the Moody chart or Moody diagram. It adapts the work of Hunter Rouse but uses the more practical choice of coordinates employed by R. J. S. Pigott, whose work was based upon an analysis of some 10,000 experiments from various sources. Measurements of fluid flow in artificially roughened pipes by J. Nikuradse were at the time too recent to include in Pigott's chart.

The chart's purpose was to provide a graphical representation of the function of C. F. Colebrook in collaboration with C. M. White, which provided a practical form of transition curve to bridge the transition zone between smooth and rough pipes, the region of incomplete turbulence.

== Description ==
Moody's team used the available data (including that of Nikuradse) to show that fluid flow in rough pipes could be described by four dimensionless quantities: Reynolds number, pressure loss coefficient, diameter ratio of the pipe and the relative roughness of the pipe. They then produced a single plot which showed that all of these collapsed onto a series of lines, now known as the Moody chart. This dimensionless chart is used to work out pressure drop, $\Delta p$ (Pa) (or head loss, $h_f$(m)) and flow rate through pipes. Head loss can be calculated using the Darcy–Weisbach equation in which the Darcy friction factor $f_D$ appears :

$$h_f = f_D \frac{L}{D} \frac{V^2}{2\,g};$$

Pressure drop can then be evaluated as:

$$\Delta p = \rho\,g\,h_f$$

or directly from

$$\Delta p =f_D \frac{\rho V^2}{2}\frac{L}{D},$$

where $\rho$ is the density of the fluid, $V$ is the average velocity in the pipe, $f_D$ is the friction factor from the Moody chart, $L$ is the length of the pipe and $D$ is the pipe diameter.

The chart plots Darcy–Weisbach friction factor $f_D$ against Reynolds number Re for a variety of relative roughnesses, the ratio of the mean height of roughness of the pipe to the pipe diameter or $\epsilon / D$.

The Moody chart can be divided into two regimes of flow: laminar and turbulent. For the laminar flow regime ($Re$< ~3000), roughness has no discernible effect, and the Darcy–Weisbach friction factor $f_D$ was determined analytically by Poiseuille:

$$f_D = 64 / \mathrm{Re}, \text{for laminar flow}.$$

For the turbulent flow regime, the relationship between the friction factor $f_D$ the Reynolds number Re, and the relative roughness $\epsilon / D$ is more complex. One model for this relationship is the Colebrook equation (which is an implicit equation in $f_D$):

$${1 \over \sqrt{f_D}}= -2.0 \log_{10} \left(\frac{\epsilon/D}{3.7} + {\frac{2.51}{\mathrm{Re} \sqrt{f_D } } } \right) , \text{for turbulent flow}.$$

Because this equation is implicit in $f_D$, solving it requires either the chart or an iterative numerical method; online calculators can also solve it directly for a given Re and $\epsilon / D$.

== Reading the chart ==
To read a friction factor from the chart, first compute the Reynolds number Re and the relative roughness $\epsilon / D$ of the pipe. Locate Re on the horizontal axis, trace a vertical line to the curve for that $\epsilon / D$ (interpolating between plotted curves if needed), and read $f_D$ from the vertical axis at that point. Below Re ≈ 2,300, a single line applies regardless of roughness, since viscous forces rather than surface irregularities govern laminar flow. Between roughly Re = 2,300 and 4,000, flow is unstable and the chart gives no reliable value.

== Explicit approximations to the Colebrook equation ==
Solving the Colebrook equation by iteration is often impractical, so several explicit approximations have been proposed. The Swamee–Jain equation gives:

$$f_D = \frac{0.25}{\left[\log_{10}\left(\frac{\epsilon/D}{3.7} + \frac{5.74}{\mathrm{Re}^{0.9}}\right)\right]^2}$$

The Haaland equation offers a similar approximation:

$$\frac{1}{\sqrt{f_D}} = -1.8 \log_{10}\left[\left(\frac{\epsilon/D}{3.7}\right)^{1.11} + \frac{6.9}{\mathrm{Re}}\right]$$

and the Churchill equation spans the laminar, transitional, and turbulent regimes in a single expression, making it well suited to computer implementation. These explicit forms, along with numerical Colebrook solvers, power most modern software and online calculators that compute $f_D$ without the printed chart.

== Limitations ==
The Moody chart and the Colebrook equation describe steady, fully developed, single-phase flow of a Newtonian fluid in a circular pipe with uniform roughness. They exclude entrance effects and pipe fittings (handled separately via minor loss coefficients), non-circular ducts (approximated using hydraulic diameter), compressible flow at high Mach number, and non-Newtonian fluids. Because the chart is built from data on commercial pipe roughness, unusual or highly non-uniform roughness can produce friction factors that diverge from its predictions.

== Fanning friction factor ==
This formula must not be confused with the Fanning equation, using the Fanning friction factor $f$, equal to one fourth the Darcy-Weisbach friction factor $f_D$. Here the pressure drop is:

$$\Delta p =\frac{\rho V^2}{2}\frac{4fL}{D},$$

== See also ==
Friction loss
Darcy friction factor formulae
