= Minor losses in pipe flow =

Minor losses in pipe flow are a major part in calculating the flow, pressure, or energy reduction in piping systems. Liquid moving through pipes carries momentum and energy due to the forces acting upon it such as pressure and gravity. Just as certain aspects of the system can increase the fluids energy, there are components of the system that act against the fluid and reduce its energy, velocity, or momentum. Friction and minor losses in pipes are major contributing factors.

== Friction Losses ==
Before being able to use the minor head losses in an equation, the losses in the system due to friction must also be calculated.

Equation for friction losses:

$H_{Lf}={v^2\over gR_h}(\sum_{i}L_{i})f$

$H_{Lf}$= Frictional head loss

$v$= Downstream velocity

$g$ = Gravity of Earth

$R_h$ = Hydraulic radius

$\sum_{i}L_{i}$ =Total length of piping

$f$ = Fanning friction factor

== Total Head Loss ==
After both minor losses and friction losses have been calculated, these values can be summed to find the total head loss.

Equation for total head loss, $H_L$, can be simplified and rewritten as:

$H_{L}={v^2\over 2gR_h}[(2\sum_{i}L_{i})f+R_h(\sum_{i}e_{v,i})]$

$H_{L}$= Frictional head loss

$v$= Downstream velocity

$g$ = Gravity of Earth

$R_h$ = Hydraulic radius

$\sum_{i}L_{i}$ =Total length of piping

$f$ = Fanning friction factor

$\sum_{i}e_{v,i}$= Sum of all kinetic energy factors in system

Once calculated, the total head loss can be used to solve the Bernoulli Equation and find unknown values of the system.

== See also ==
- Hydraulic head
- Total dynamic head
