= Heuristic argument =

A heuristic argument is an argument that reasons from the value of a method or principle that has been shown experimentally (especially through trial-and-error) to be useful or convincing in learning, discovery and problem-solving, but whose line of reasoning involves key oversimplifications that make it not entirely rigorous. A widely used and important example of a heuristic argument is Occam's razor.

It is a speculative, non-rigorous argument that relies on analogy or intuition, and that allows one to achieve a result or an approximation that is to be checked later with more rigor. Otherwise, the results are generally to be doubted. It is used as a hypothesis or a conjecture in an investigation, though it can also be used as a mnemonic as well.

== See also ==
- Empirical relationship
- Heuristic
- Probabilistic method
- Rule of thumb
