= Total dynamic head =

Term used in fluid dynamics

In fluid dynamics, total dynamic head (TDH) is the work to be done by a pump, per unit weight, per unit volume of fluid. TDH is expressed as the total equivalent height that a fluid is to be pumped, taking into account friction losses in the pipe. TDH is essential for pump specification.

$${TDH = \Delta z + \Delta \frac{p}{\rho g} + \Delta \frac{v^2}{2g}} + h_F$$

TDH = Static Lift + Pressure Head + Velocity Head + Friction Loss

where:

Static lift is the difference in elevation between the suction point and the discharge point.
Pressure head is the difference in pressure between the suction point and the discharge point, expressed as an equivalent height of fluid.
Velocity head represents the kinetic energy of the fluid due to its bulk motion.
Friction loss (or head loss) represents energy lost to friction as fluid flows through the pipe.

This equation can be derived from Bernoulli's Equation.

For incompressible liquids such as water, Static lift + Pressure head together equal the difference in fluid surface elevation between the suction basin and the discharge basin.

== See also ==
- Hydraulic head
- Fluid dynamics
