= Prony equation =

Hydraulics equation for frictional head loss

The Prony equation (named after Gaspard de Prony) is a historically important equation in hydraulics, used to calculate the head loss due to friction within a given run of pipe. It is an empirical equation developed by Frenchman Gaspard de Prony in the 19th century:

$$h_f = \frac{L}{D} (aV + bV^2)$$

where h_{f} is the head loss due to friction, calculated from: the ratio of the length to diameter of the pipe L/D, the velocity of the flow V, and two empirical factors a and b to account for friction.

This equation has been supplanted in modern hydraulics by the Darcy–Weisbach equation, which used it as a starting point.
