= Lewis Ferry Moody =

American engineer and professor

- Born: 5 January 1880; Philadelphia, Pennsylvania
- Died: April 18, 1953 (aged 73); Princeton, New Jersey
- Occupation: Mechanical engineer
- Employer: Princeton University
- Known for: Moody chart
- Awards: Elliott Cresson Medal (1945)

Lewis Ferry Moody (5 January 1880 – 18 April 1953) was an American engineer and professor, best known for the Moody chart, a diagram capturing relationships between several variables used in calculating fluid flow through a pipe. He states that his goal is to present a simple and convenient means for engineers to estimate the friction factor inside the new pipes and conduits running full with steady flow. He has 23 patents for his inventions. He was the first Professor of Hydraulics in the School of Engineering at Princeton.

Moody chart showing friction factor plotted against Reynolds number for various roughnesses

== Biography ==
He was born on 5 January 1880.

Lewis F. Moody as professor of fluid mechanics and machine design taught at Princeton University starting in 1930. He co-wrote the book Fifty Years’ Progress in Hydraulics with fellow engineer Blake R. Van Leer.

He married Eleanor Greene. His wife died in 1937. His daughter, Eleanor Lowry Moody, married in 1944. He was awarded the Elliott Cresson Medal in 1945.

He was elected an Honorary Member of the American Society of Mechanical Engineers (ASME) in 1951.

He died on 18 April 1953.

== Legacy ==
Five years after his death, ASME created an Award to his honours: The Lewis F. Moody award, which is awarded for outstanding original papers useful to the practice of mechanical engineering by the Fluids Engineering Division (FED).
