= Pipe flow =

Type of liquid flow within a closed conduit

In fluid mechanics, pipe flow is a type of fluid flow within a closed conduit, such as a pipe, duct or tube. It is also called as Internal flow. The other type of flow within a conduit is open channel flow. These two types of flow are similar in many ways, but differ in one important aspect. Pipe flow does not have a free surface which is found in open-channel flow. Pipe flow, being confined within closed conduit, does not exert direct atmospheric pressure, but does exert hydraulic pressure on the conduit.

Not all flow within a closed conduit is considered pipe flow. Storm sewers are closed conduits but usually maintain a free surface and therefore are considered open-channel flow. The exception to this is when a storm sewer operates at full capacity, and then can become pipe flow.

Energy in pipe flow is expressed as head and is defined by the Bernoulli equation. In order to conceptualize head along the course of flow within a pipe, diagrams often contain a hydraulic grade line (HGL). The viscous shear forces in the fluid causes pipe flow to experience frictional losses as defined by the Darcy-Weisbach formula.

== Laminar-turbulence transition ==
The behavior of pipe flow is governed mainly by the effects of viscosity and gravity relative to the inertial forces of the flow. Depending on the effect of viscosity relative to inertia, as represented by the Reynolds number, the flow can be either laminar or turbulent. For circular pipes of different surface roughness, at a Reynolds number below the critical value of approximately 2000 pipe flow will ultimately be laminar, whereas above the critical value turbulent flow can persist, as shown in Moody chart. For non-circular pipes, such as rectangular ducts, the critical Reynolds number is shifted, but still $\sim \mathcal{O}(10^3)$ depending on the aspect ratio. Earlier transition to turbulence, happening at Reynolds number one order of magnitude smaller, i.e. $\sim \mathcal{O}(10^2)$, can happen in channels with special geometrical shapes, such as the Tesla valve.

Flow through pipes can roughly be divided into two:

- Laminar flow - see Hagen-Poiseuille flow
- Turbulent flow - see Moody diagram

== See also ==
- Mathematical equations and concepts
  - Bernoulli equation
  - Darcy–Weisbach equation
  - Torricelli's law
- Fields of study
  - Hydraulics
  - Fluid Mechanics
- Types of fluid flow
  - Open channel flow
  - Plug flow
- Fluid properties
  - Viscosity
- Fluid phenomena
  - Head
