= Empirical relationship =

Relationship inferred from observation

In science, an empirical relationship or phenomenological relationship is a formula or association that is supported by experiment or observation but not necessarily supported by theory.

== Phenomenological model ==
A phenomenological model is a scientific model derived from empirical relationships. It forgoes any attempt to explain why its variables interact the way they do, and simply attempts to describe how they relate, with the assumption that the relationship extends, at least within an acceptable error margin, past the measured values. Although not directly derived from first principles, an empirical observation -based model will only be able provide reliable and accurate correspondence to the real world inasmuch as it is consistent with the underlying fundamental theory behind the phenomena being described. Regression analysis is sometimes used to create statistical models that serve as phenomenological models.

=== Applicability ===
Phenomenological models have been characterized as being completely independent of theories, though many phenomenological models, while failing to be derivable from a theory, incorporate principles and laws associated with theories. The liquid drop model of the atomic nucleus, for instance, portrays the nucleus as a liquid drop and describes it as having several properties (surface tension and charge, among others) originating in different theories (hydrodynamics and electrodynamics, respectively). Certain paradigmatic features of these theories—though usually not the complete theory—are then used to determine both the static and dynamical properties of the nucleus.

==== Approximations ====
Some empirical relationships are merely approximations, often equivalent to the first few terms of the Taylor series of an analytical solution describing a phenomenon. Other relationships only hold under certain specific conditions, reducing them to special cases of more general relationship. Some approximations, in particular phenomenological models, may even contradict theory; they are employed because they are more mathematically tractable than some theories, and are able to yield results.

== Empiricism and epistemology ==
An empirical relationship is supported by confirmatory data irrespective of theoretical basis such as first principles. Sometimes theoretical explanations for what were initially empirical relationships are found, in which case the relationships are no longer considered empirical. An example was the Rydberg formula to predict the wavelengths of hydrogen spectral lines. Proposed in 1876, it perfectly predicted the wavelengths of the Lyman series, but lacked a theoretical basis until Niels Bohr produced his Bohr model of the atom in 1925.

On occasion, what was thought to be an empirical factor is later deemed to be a fundamental physical constant.

== See also ==
- Empiricism
- Heuristic argument
- Power law
