= Hydraulic head =

Concept in hydrology

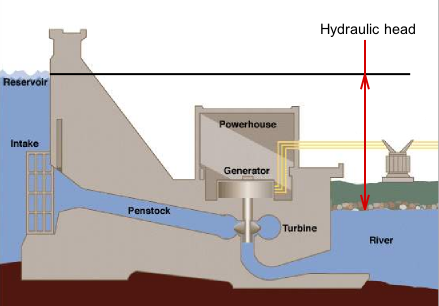
Available difference in hydraulic head across a hydroelectric dam, before head losses due to turbines, wall friction and turbulence

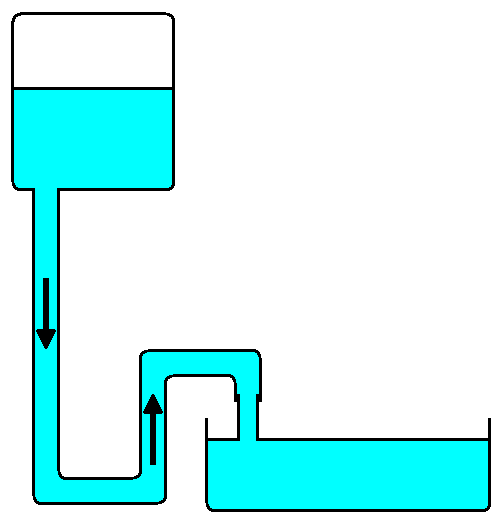
Fluid flows from the tank at the top to the basin at the bottom under the pressure of the hydraulic head.

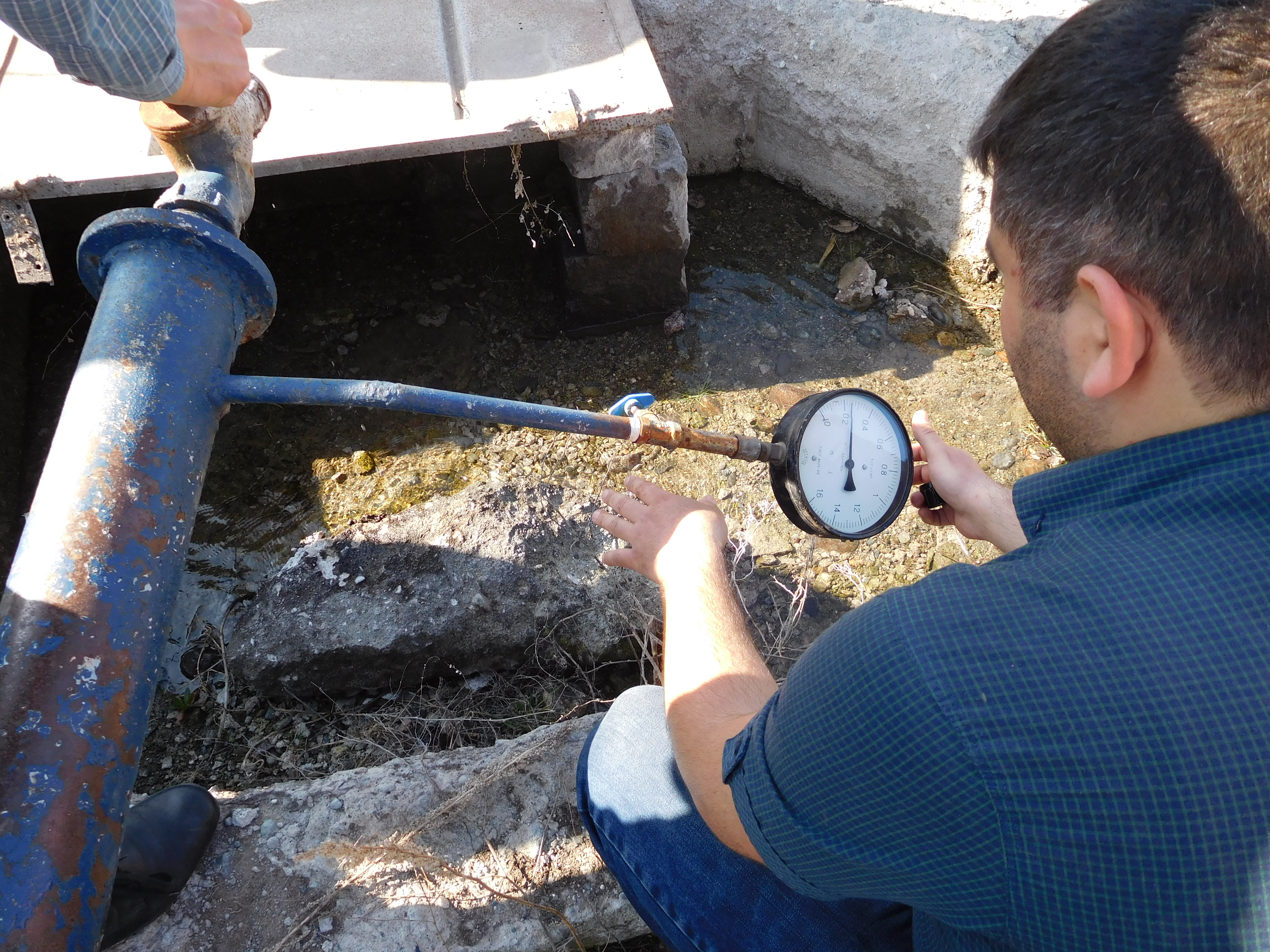
Measuring hydraulic head in an artesian aquifer, where the water level is above the ground surface

Hydraulic head or piezometric head is a measurement related to liquid pressure (normalized by specific weight) and the liquid elevation above a vertical datum. It is usually measured as an equivalent liquid surface elevation, expressed in units of length, at the entrance (or bottom) of a piezometer. In an aquifer, it can be calculated from the depth to water in a piezometric well (a specialized water well), and given information of the piezometer's elevation and screen depth. Hydraulic head can similarly be measured in a column of water using a standpipe piezometer by measuring the height of the water surface in the tube relative to a common datum. The hydraulic head can be used to determine a hydraulic gradient between two or more points.

== Definition ==
In fluid dynamics, the head at some point in an incompressible (constant density) flow is equal to the height of a static column of fluid whose pressure at the base is equal to the static pressure at that point. As greater energy per unit volume corresponds to a taller column, head increases with energy per unit volume and serves as an alternate measure of it.

Head has dimension of length and is expressed in units such as meters or feet, whereas energy per unit volume has dimension of energy over volume, and is expressed in units such as Pa or psi. It may therefore be questioned whether one really is a measure of the other. This discrepancy can be resolved by noting that length is dimensionally equivalent to energy over weight (the higher a mass of liquid is raised, the greater its potential energy per unit weight), and remembering the restriction to incompressible (constant density) flow so that weight ∝ volume. It follows that while these measures of energy density are not equivalent, they do at least stand in a simple proportional relationship.

To justify this definition further, it can be noted that the aforementioned proportionality is practically useful in certain energy based analyses. For example, suppose we have a raised tank containing fluid flowing out through a pipe under the influence of gravity. We wish to know whether this system will produce a particular minimum flow rate through the pipes. Consider starting with the gravitational potential energy of the fluid in the tank and subtracting the energy that will be lost to friction from the pipe walls. If the result is negative, the energy losses must exceed the initial energy in the tank, implying that the desired flow rate cannot physically be sustained, so the tank must be raised. However, note that this conclusion depends only on whether the final result is positive or negative. Because head is proportional to energy per unit volume, it can stand in for energy in such an analysis. The elevation head (see below) is practically determined by simple measurement of the height of the tank and pipe outlets.

The hydrostatic pressure at the base of a column of fluid with density $\rho$, height $h$ and gravitational acceleration $g$, as well as the potential energy per unit volume of a static fluid element at height $h$ above datum, is $\rho g h$. The total energy per unit volume is given by Bernoulli's equation in pressure form with static pressure $p$, velocity $v$ and height $z$ as $p + \frac{1}{2}\rho v^2 + \rho g z$. Equating these and dividing by $\rho g$ leads to,
$$h = \frac{p}{\rho g} + \frac{v^2}{2g} + z$$
. The individual terms can be interpreted as follows:

1. $p/\rho g$ is the pressure head due to the static pressure, the internal random molecular motion of the fluid.
2. $\frac{v^2}{2g}$ is the velocity head due to the bulk motion (kinetic energy) of the fluid.
3. $z$ is the elevation head due to the fluid's weight, the gravitational force acting on a column of fluid.

On Earth, additional height of fresh water adds a static pressure of about 9.8 kPa per meter (0.098 bar/m) or 0.433 psi per foot of water column height.

The static head of a pump is the maximum height (pressure) it can deliver. The capability of the pump at a certain RPM can be read from its Q-H curve (flow vs. height).

Head is useful in specifying centrifugal pumps because their pumping characteristics tend to be independent of the fluid's density.

== Components ==
After free falling through a height $h$ in a vacuum from an initial velocity of 0, a mass will have reached a speed
$$v=\sqrt{{2 g}{h}}$$
where $g$ is the acceleration due to gravity. Rearranged as a head:
$$h = \frac{v^2}{2 g}.$$

The term $\frac{v^{2}}{2 g}$ is called the velocity head, expressed as a length measurement. In a flowing fluid, it represents the energy of the fluid due to its bulk motion.

The total hydraulic head of a fluid is composed of pressure head and elevation head. The pressure head is the equivalent gauge pressure of a column of water at the base of the piezometer, and the elevation head is the relative potential energy in terms of an elevation. The head equation, a simplified form of the Bernoulli principle for incompressible fluids, can be expressed as:
$$h = \psi + z$$
where

- $h$ is the hydraulic head (Length in m or ft), also known as the piezometric head.
- $\psi$ is the pressure head, in terms of the elevation difference of the water column relative to the piezometer bottom (Length in m or ft), and
- $z$ is the elevation at the piezometer bottom (Length in m or ft)

In an example with a 400 m deep piezometer, with an elevation of 1000 m, and a depth to water of 100 m: z = 600 m, ψ = 300 m, and h = 900 m.

The pressure head can be expressed as:
$$\psi = \frac{P}{\gamma} = \frac{P}{\rho g}$$
where $P$ is the gauge pressure (Force per unit area, often Pa or psi),

- $\gamma$ is the unit weight of the liquid (Force per unit volume, typically N·m^{−3} or lbf/ft^{3}),
- $\rho$ is the density of the liquid (Mass per unit volume, frequently kg·m^{−3}), and
- $g$ is the gravitational acceleration (velocity change per unit time, often m·s^{−2})

=== Fresh water head ===
The pressure head is dependent on the density of water, which can vary depending on both the temperature and chemical composition (salinity, in particular). This means that the hydraulic head calculation is dependent on the density of the water within the piezometer. If one or more hydraulic head measurements are to be compared, they need to be standardized, usually to their fresh water head, which can be calculated as:

$$h_\mathrm{fw} = \psi \frac{\rho}{\rho_\mathrm{fw}} + z$$

where

- $h_\mathrm{fw}$ is the fresh water head (Length, measured in m or ft), and
- $\rho_\mathrm{fw}$ is the density of fresh water (Mass per unit volume, typically in kg·m^{−3})

== Hydraulic gradient ==
The hydraulic gradient is a vector gradient between two or more hydraulic head measurements over the length of the flow path. For groundwater, it is also called the Darcy slope, since it determines the quantity of a Darcy flux or discharge. It also has applications in open-channel flow where it is also known as stream gradient and can be used to determine whether a reach is gaining or losing energy.

The hydraulic gradient norm $i$, a dimensionless quantity (of kind length per length), can be calculated between two points with known head values as a ratio:
$$i = \frac{dh}{dl}$$
where

- $dh=h_2 - h_1$ is the difference between two hydraulic heads (length, usually in m or ft), and
- $dl$ is the flow path length between the two piezometers (length, usually in m or ft)

The hydraulic gradient vector $\nabla h$ can be formulated using the del operator for a spatial gradient. This requires a hydraulic head field, which can be practically obtained only from numerical models, such as MODFLOW for groundwater or standard step or HEC-RAS for open channels. In Cartesian coordinates, this can be expressed as:
$$\nabla h = \left(
{\frac{\partial h}{\partial x}},
{\frac{\partial h}{\partial y}},
{\frac{\partial h}{\partial z}}
\right) =
{\frac{\partial h}{\partial x}}\mathbf{i} +
{\frac{\partial h}{\partial y}}\mathbf{j} +
{\frac{\partial h}{\partial z}}\mathbf{k}$$
This vector describes both the magnitude and the direction of the groundwater flow, where negative values indicate flow along the dimension, and zero indicates 'no flow'. As with any other example in physics, energy must flow from high to low, which is why the flow is in the negative gradient. This vector can be used in conjunction with Darcy's law and a tensor of hydraulic conductivity to determine the flux of water in three dimensions.

== In groundwater ==
Relation between heads for a hydrostatic case and a downward flow case.

The distribution of hydraulic head through an aquifer determines where groundwater will flow. In a hydrostatic example (first figure), where the hydraulic head is constant, there is no flow. However, if there is a difference in hydraulic head from the top to bottom due to draining from the bottom (second figure), the water will flow downward, due to the difference in head, also called the hydraulic gradient.

=== Atmospheric pressure ===
Even though it is convention to use gauge pressure in the calculation of hydraulic head, it is more correct to use absolute pressure (gauge pressure + atmospheric pressure), since this is truly what drives groundwater flow. Often detailed observations of barometric pressure are not available at each well through time, so this is often disregarded (contributing to large errors at locations where hydraulic gradients are low or the angle between wells is acute.)

The effects of changes in atmospheric pressure upon water levels observed in wells has been known for many years. The effect is a direct one, an increase in atmospheric pressure is an increase in load on the water in the aquifer, which increases the depth to water (lowers the water level elevation). Pascal first qualitatively observed these effects in the 17th century, and they were more rigorously described by the soil physicist Edgar Buckingham (working for the United States Department of Agriculture (USDA)) using air flow models in 1907.

== Head loss ==
In any real moving fluid, energy is dissipated due to friction; turbulence dissipates even more energy for high Reynolds number flows. This dissipation, called head loss, is divided into two main categories, "major losses" associated with energy loss per length of pipe, and "minor losses" associated with bends, fittings, valves, etc. The most common equation used to calculate major head losses is the Darcy-Weisbach equation. Older, more empirical approaches include the Hazen–Williams equation and the Prony equation.

For relatively short pipe systems, with a relatively large number of bends and fittings, minor losses can easily exceed major losses. In design, minor losses are usually estimated from tables using coefficients or a simpler and less accurate reduction of minor losses to equivalent length of pipe, a method often used for shortcut calculations of pneumatic conveying lines pressure drop.

== See also ==
- Borda–Carnot equation
- Dynamic pressure
- Minor losses in pipe flow
- Total dynamic head
- Stage (hydrology)
- Head (hydrology)
- Hydraulic accumulator
- Hydrogeology#Further reading
