= Hagen–Poiseuille equation =

Law describing the pressure drop in an incompressible and Newtonian fluid

In fluid dynamics, the Hagen–Poiseuille equation, also known as the Hagen–Poiseuille law, Poiseuille law or Poiseuille equation, is a physical law that gives the pressure drop in an incompressible and Newtonian fluid in laminar flow flowing through a long cylindrical pipe of constant cross section. It can be successfully applied to air flow in the airways of the lungs, or the flow through a drinking straw or through a hypodermic needle. It was experimentally derived independently by Jean Léonard Marie Poiseuille in 1838 and Gotthilf Heinrich Ludwig Hagen, and published by Hagen in 1839 and then by Poiseuille in 1840–41 and 1846. The theoretical justification of the Poiseuille law was given by George Stokes in 1845.

The assumptions of the equation are that the fluid is incompressible and Newtonian; the flow is laminar through a pipe of constant circular cross-section that is substantially longer than its diameter; and there is no acceleration of fluid in the pipe. For velocities and pipe diameters above a threshold, actual fluid flow is not laminar but turbulent, leading to larger pressure drops than calculated by the Hagen–Poiseuille equation.

Poiseuille's equation describes the pressure drop due to the viscosity of the fluid; other types of pressure drops may still occur in a fluid (see a demonstration here). For example, the pressure needed to drive a viscous fluid up against gravity would contain both that as needed in Poiseuille's law plus that as needed in Bernoulli's equation, such that any point in the flow would have a pressure greater than zero (otherwise no flow would happen).

Another example is when blood flows into a narrower constriction, its speed will be greater than in a larger diameter (due to continuity of volumetric flow rate), and its pressure will be lower than in a larger diameter (due to Bernoulli's equation). However, the viscosity of blood will cause additional pressure drop along the direction of flow, which is proportional to length traveled (as per Poiseuille's law). Both effects contribute to the actual pressure drop.

== Equation ==
In standard fluid-kinetics notation:

$$\Delta p = \frac{8 \mu L Q}{\pi R^4} = \frac{8 \pi \mu L Q}{A^2},$$

where

Δp is the pressure difference between the two ends,
L is the length of pipe,
μ is the dynamic viscosity,
Q is the volumetric flow rate,
R is the pipe radius,
A is the cross-sectional area of pipe.

The equation does not hold close to the pipe entrance.

The equation fails in the limit of low viscosity, wide and/or short pipe. Low viscosity or a wide pipe may result in turbulent flow, making it necessary to use more complex models, such as the Darcy–Weisbach equation. The ratio of length to radius of a pipe should be greater than 1/48 of the Reynolds number for the Hagen–Poiseuille law to be valid. If the pipe is too short, the Hagen–Poiseuille equation may result in unphysically high flow rates; the flow is bounded by Bernoulli's principle, under less restrictive conditions, by

$$\begin{align}
\Delta p = \frac{1}{2} \rho \overline{v}_\text{max}^2 &= \frac{1}{2} \rho \left(\frac{Q_\text{max}}{\pi R^2}\right)^2 \\
\Rightarrow \quad  Q_\max{} &= \pi R^2 \sqrt\frac{2 \Delta p}{\rho},
\end{align}$$

because it is impossible to have negative (absolute) pressure (not to be confused with gauge pressure) in an incompressible flow.

== Relation to the Darcy–Weisbach equation ==
Velocity profile of a Hagen-Poiseuille flow

Normally, Hagen–Poiseuille flow implies not just the relation for the pressure drop, above, but also the full solution for the laminar flow profile, which is parabolic. However, the result for the pressure drop can be extended to turbulent flow by inferring an effective turbulent viscosity in the case of turbulent flow, even though the flow profile in turbulent flow is strictly speaking not actually parabolic. In both cases, laminar or turbulent, the pressure drop is related to the stress at the wall, which determines the so-called friction factor. The wall stress can be determined phenomenologically by the Darcy–Weisbach equation in the field of hydraulics, given a relationship for the friction factor in terms of the Reynolds number. In the case of laminar flow, for a circular cross section:

$$\Lambda = \frac{64}{\mathrm{Re}}, \quad \mathrm{Re} = \frac{\rho v d}{\mu},$$

where Re is the Reynolds number, ρ is the fluid density, and v is the mean flow velocity, which is half the maximal flow velocity in the case of laminar flow. It proves more useful to define the Reynolds number in terms of the mean flow velocity because this quantity remains well defined even in the case of turbulent flow, whereas the maximal flow velocity may not be, or in any case, it may be difficult to infer. In this form the law approximates the Darcy friction factor, the energy (head) loss factor, friction loss factor or Darcy (friction) factor Λ in the laminar flow at very low velocities in cylindrical tube. The theoretical derivation of a slightly different form of the law was made independently by Wiedman in 1856 and Neumann and E. Hagenbach in 1858 (1859, 1860). Hagenbach was the first who called this law Poiseuille's law.

The law is also very important in hemorheology and hemodynamics, both fields of physiology.

Poiseuille's law was later in 1891 extended to turbulent flow by L. R. Wilberforce, based on Hagenbach's work.

== Derivation ==
The Hagen–Poiseuille equation can be derived from the Navier–Stokes equations. The laminar flow through a pipe of uniform (circular) cross-section is known as Hagen–Poiseuille flow. The equations governing the Hagen–Poiseuille flow can be derived directly from the Navier–Stokes momentum equations in 3D cylindrical coordinates (r,θ,x) by making the following set of assumptions:

1. The flow is steady ( ∂.../∂t = 0 ).
2. The radial and azimuthal components of the fluid velocity are zero ( u_{r} = u_{θ} = 0 ).
3. The flow is axisymmetric ( ∂.../∂θ = 0 ).
4. The flow is fully developed ( ∂u_{x}/∂x = 0 ). Here however, this can be proved via mass conservation, and the above assumptions.

Then the angular equation in the momentum equations and the continuity equation are identically satisfied. The radial momentum equation reduces to ∂p/∂r = 0, i.e., the pressure p is a function of the axial coordinate x only. For brevity, use u instead of $u_x$. The axial momentum equation reduces to

$$\frac{1}{r}\frac{\partial}{\partial r}\left(r \frac{\partial u}{\partial r}\right)= \frac{1}{\mu} \frac{\mathrm{d} p}{\mathrm{d} x}$$

where μ is the dynamic viscosity of the fluid. In the above equation, the left-hand side is only a function of r and the right-hand side term is only a function of x, implying that both terms must be the same constant. Evaluating this constant is straightforward. If we take the length of the pipe to be L and denote the pressure difference between the two ends of the pipe by Δp (high pressure minus low pressure), then the constant is simply

$$-\frac{\mathrm{d}p}{\mathrm{d}x} = \frac{\Delta p}{L} = G$$

defined such that G is positive. The solution is

$$u = -\frac{Gr^2}{4\mu} + c_1 \ln r + c_2$$

Since u needs to be finite at r = 0, c_{1} = 0. The no slip boundary condition at the pipe wall requires that u = 0 at r = R (radius of the pipe), which yields c_{2} = GR^{2}/4μ. Thus we have finally the following parabolic velocity profile:

$$u = \frac{G}{4\mu} \left(R^2 - r^2\right).$$

The maximum velocity occurs at the pipe centerline (r = 0), u_{max} = GR^{2}/4μ. The average velocity can be obtained by integrating over the pipe cross section,

$${u}_\mathrm{avg}=\frac{1}{\pi R^2} \int_0^R 2\pi ru  \mathrm{d}r = \tfrac{1}{2} {u}_\mathrm{max}.$$

The easily measurable quantity in experiments is the volumetric flow rate Q = πR^{2} u_{avg}. Rearrangement of this gives the Hagen–Poiseuille equation

$$\Delta p  = \frac{8\mu Q L}{\pi R^4}.$$

Elaborate derivation starting directly from first principles

Although more lengthy than directly using the Navier–Stokes equations, an alternative method of deriving the Hagen–Poiseuille equation is as follows.

=== Liquid flow through a pipe ===
a) A tube showing the imaginary lamina. b) A cross section of the tube shows the lamina moving at different speeds. Those closest to the edge of the tube are moving slowly while those near the center are moving quickly.

Assume the liquid exhibits laminar flow. Laminar flow in a round pipe prescribes that there are a bunch of circular layers (lamina) of liquid, each having a velocity determined only by their radial distance from the center of the tube. Also assume the center is moving fastest while the liquid touching the walls of the tube is stationary (due to the no-slip condition).

To figure out the motion of the liquid, all forces acting on each lamina must be known:

1. The pressure force pushing the liquid through the tube is the change in pressure multiplied by the area: F = −A Δp. This force is in the direction of the motion of the liquid. The negative sign comes from the conventional way we define Δp = p_{end} − p_{top} < 0.
2. Viscosity effects will pull from the faster lamina immediately closer to the center of the tube.
3. Viscosity effects will drag from the slower lamina immediately closer to the walls of the tube.

=== Viscosity ===
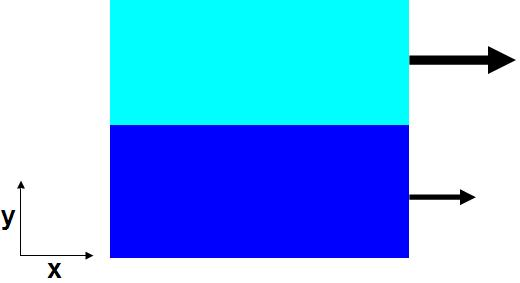
Two fluids moving past each other in the x direction. The liquid on top is moving faster and will be pulled in the negative direction by the bottom liquid while the bottom liquid will be pulled in the positive direction by the top liquid.

When two layers of liquid in contact with each other move at different speeds, there will be a shear force between them. This force is proportional to the area of contact A, the velocity gradient perpendicular to the direction of flow Δv_{x}/Δy, and a proportionality constant (viscosity) and is given by

$$F_\text{viscosity, top} = - \mu A \frac{\Delta v_x}{\Delta y}.$$

The negative sign is in there because we are concerned with the faster moving liquid (top in figure), which is being slowed by the slower liquid (bottom in figure). By Newton's third law of motion, the force on the slower liquid is equal and opposite (no negative sign) to the force on the faster liquid. This equation assumes that the area of contact is so large that we can ignore any effects from the edges and that the fluids behave as Newtonian fluids.

=== Faster lamina ===
Assume that we are figuring out the force on the lamina with radius r. From the equation above, we need to know the area of contact and the velocity gradient. Think of the lamina as a ring of radius r, thickness dr, and length Δx. The area of contact between the lamina and the faster one is simply the surface area of the cylinder: A = 2πr Δx. We don't know the exact form for the velocity of the liquid within the tube yet, but we do know (from our assumption above) that it is dependent on the radius. Therefore, the velocity gradient is the change of the velocity with respect to the change in the radius at the intersection of these two laminae. That intersection is at a radius of r. So, considering that this force will be positive with respect to the movement of the liquid (but the derivative of the velocity is negative), the final form of the equation becomes

$$F_\text{viscosity, fast} = - 2 \pi r \mu \, \Delta x \, \left. \frac{\mathrm{d}v}{\mathrm{d}r} \right|_r$$

where the vertical bar and subscript r following the derivative indicates that it should be taken at a radius of r.

=== Slower lamina ===
Next let's find the force of drag from the slower lamina. We need to calculate the same values that we did for the force from the faster lamina. In this case, the area of contact is at r + dr instead of r. Also, we need to remember that this force opposes the direction of movement of the liquid and will therefore be negative (and that the derivative of the velocity is negative).

$$F_\text{viscosity, slow} = 2 \pi (r + \mathrm{d}r)\mu \, \Delta x \left. \frac{\mathrm{d}v}{\mathrm{d}r} \right|_{r+\mathrm{d}r}$$

=== Putting it all together ===
To find the solution for the flow of a laminar layer through a tube, we need to make one last assumption. There is no acceleration of liquid in the pipe, and by Newton's first law, there is no net force. If there is no net force then we can add all of the forces together to get zero

$$0 = F_\text{pressure} + F_\text{viscosity, fast} + F_\text{viscosity, slow}$$

or

$$0 = - \Delta p 2 \pi r\,\mathrm{d}r - 2 \pi r \mu \,\Delta x \left. \frac{\mathrm{d}v}{\mathrm{d}r} \right|_r + 2 \pi (r + \mathrm{d}r) \mu \,\Delta x \,\left. \frac{\mathrm{d}v}{\mathrm{d}r} \right \vert_{r+\mathrm{d}r}.$$

First, to get everything happening at the same point, use the first two terms of a Taylor series expansion of the velocity gradient:

$$\left. \frac{\mathrm{d}v}{\mathrm{d}r} \right|_{r+\mathrm{d}r} = \left. \frac{\mathrm{d}v}{\mathrm{d}r} \right|_r + \left. \frac{\mathrm{d}^2 v}{\mathrm{d}r^2} \right|_r \,\mathrm{d}r .$$

The expression is valid for all laminae. Grouping like terms and dropping the vertical bar since all derivatives are assumed to be at radius r,

$$0 = - \Delta p 2 \pi r \, \mathrm{d}r + 2 \pi \mu \, \mathrm{d}r \, \Delta x \frac{\mathrm{d}v}{\mathrm{d}r} + 2 \pi r \mu \, \mathrm{d}r \, \Delta x \frac{\mathrm{d}^2 v}{\mathrm{d}r^2} + 2 \pi \mu (\mathrm{d}r)^2 \, \Delta x \frac{\mathrm{d}^2 v}{\mathrm{d}r^2}.$$

Finally, put this expression in the form of a differential equation, dropping the term quadratic in dr.

$$\frac{1}{\mu} \frac{\Delta p}{\Delta x} = \frac{\mathrm{d}^2 v}{\mathrm{d}r^2} + \frac{1}{r} \frac{\mathrm{d}v}{\mathrm{d}r}$$

The above equation is the same as the one obtained from the Navier–Stokes equations and the derivation from here on follows as before.

=== Startup of Poiseuille flow in a pipe ===
When a constant pressure gradient G = −dp/dx is applied between two ends of a long pipe, the flow will not immediately obtain Poiseuille profile, rather it develops through time and reaches the Poiseuille profile at steady state. The Navier–Stokes equations reduce to

$$\frac{\partial u}{\partial t} = \frac{G}{\rho} + \nu \left(\frac{\partial^2 u}{\partial r^2} + \frac{1}{r} \frac{\partial u}{\partial r}\right)$$

with initial and boundary conditions,

$$u(r,0) = 0, \quad u(R,t) = 0.$$

The velocity distribution is given by

$$u(r,t) = \frac{G}{4\mu}\left(R^2-r^2\right) - \frac{2GR^2}{\mu} \sum_{n=1}^\infty \frac{1}{\lambda_n^3} \frac{J_0(\lambda_n r/R)}{J_1(\lambda_n)} e^{-\lambda_n^2 \nu t/R^2}, \quad J_0\left(\lambda_n\right)=0$$

where J_{0}(λ_{n}r/R) is the Bessel function of the first kind of order zero and λ_{n} are the positive roots of this function and J_{1}(λ_{n}) is the Bessel function of the first kind of order one. As t → ∞, Poiseuille solution is recovered.

== Poiseuille flow in an annular section ==
Poiseuille flow in annular section

If R_{1} is the inner cylinder radii and R_{2} is the outer cylinder radii, with constant applied pressure gradient between the two ends G = −dp/dx, the velocity distribution and the volume flux through the annular pipe are

$$\begin{align}
u(r) &= \frac{G}{4\mu}\left(R_1^2-r^2\right) + \frac{G}{4\mu}\left(R_2^2-R_1^2\right) \frac{\ln(r/R_1)}{\ln(R_2/R_1)},\\[6pt]
Q &= \frac{G \pi}{8\mu}\left[R_2^4-R_1^4- \frac{\left(R_2^2-R_1^2\right)^2}{\ln(R_2/R_1)}\right]   .
\end{align}$$

When R_{2} = R and R_{1} tends to zero, the original problem is recovered.

== Poiseuille flow in a pipe with an oscillating pressure gradient ==
Flow through pipes with an oscillating pressure gradient finds applications in blood flow through large arteries. The imposed pressure gradient is given by

$$\frac{\partial p}{\partial x} = -G -\alpha \cos\omega t-\beta\sin\omega t$$

where G, α and β are constants and ω is the frequency. The velocity field is given by

$$u(r,t)=\frac{G}{4\mu}\left(R^2-r^2\right) + [\alpha F_2 + \beta (F_1-1)]\frac{\cos\omega t}{\rho \omega} + [\beta F_2 - \alpha (F_1-1)]\frac{\sin\omega t}{\rho \omega}$$

where

$$\begin{align}
F_1(kr) &= \frac{\mathrm{ber}(kr)\mathrm{ber}(kR) + \mathrm{bei}(kr) \mathrm{bei}(kR)}{\mathrm{ber}^2(kR) + \mathrm{bei}^2(kR)}, \\[6pt]
F_2(kr) &= \frac{\mathrm{ber}(kr)\mathrm{bei}(kR) - \mathrm{bei}(kr) \mathrm{ber}(kR)}{\mathrm{ber}^2(kR) + \mathrm{bei}^2(kR)},
\end{align}$$

where ber and bei are the Kelvin functions and k^{2} = ρω/μ.

== Plane Poiseuille flow ==
Plane Poiseuille flow

Plane Poiseuille flow is flow created between two infinitely long parallel plates, separated by a distance h with a constant pressure gradient G = −dp/dx is applied in the direction of flow. The flow is essentially unidirectional because of infinite length. The Navier–Stokes equations reduce to

$$\frac{\mathrm{d}^2 u}{\mathrm{d}y^2} = - \frac{G}{\mu}$$

with no-slip condition on both walls

$$u(0)=0, \quad u(h)=0$$

Therefore, the velocity distribution and the volume flow rate per unit length are

$$u(y) = \frac{G}{2\mu} y(h-y), \quad Q = \frac{Gh^3}{12\mu}.$$

== Poiseuille flow through some non-circular cross-sections ==
Joseph Boussinesq derived the velocity profile and volume flow rate in 1868 for rectangular channel and tubes of equilateral triangular cross-section and for elliptical cross-section. Joseph Proudman derived the same for isosceles triangles in 1914. Let G = −dp/dx be the constant pressure gradient acting in direction parallel to the motion.

The velocity and the volume flow rate in a rectangular channel of height 0 ≤ y ≤ h and width 0 ≤ z ≤ l are

$$\begin{align}
u(y,z) &= \frac{G}{2\mu} y(h-y) - \frac{4Gh^2}{\mu \pi^3} \sum_{n=1}^\infty \frac{1}{(2n-1)^3} \frac{\sinh(\beta_n z) + \sinh [\beta_n (l-z)]}{\sinh (\beta_n l)} \sin (\beta_n y), \quad \beta_n = \frac{(2n-1)\pi}{h},\\[6pt]
Q &= \frac{Gh^3l}{12\mu} - \frac{16 G h^4}{\pi^5 \mu} \sum_{n=1}^\infty \frac{1}{(2n-1)^5} \frac{\cosh(\beta_n l) - 1}{\sinh(\beta_n l)}.
\end{align}$$

The velocity and the volume flow rate of tube with equilateral triangular cross-section of side length 2h/√3 are

$$\begin{align}
u(y,z) &= - \frac{G}{4\mu h} (y-h)\left(y^2-3z^2\right),\\[6pt]
Q &= \frac{Gh^4}{60\sqrt 3 \mu}.
\end{align}$$

The velocity and the volume flow rate in the right-angled isosceles triangle y = π, y ± z = 0 are

$$\begin{align}
u(y,z) &= \frac{G}{2\mu}(y+z)(\pi-y) - \frac{G}{\pi\mu} \sum_{n=1}^\infty \frac{1}{\beta_n^3 \sinh(2\pi\beta_n)} \left\{\sinh[\beta_n (2\pi-y+z)]\sin[\beta_n(y+z)] - \sinh[\beta_n(y+z)]\sin[\beta_n(y-z)] \right\} , \quad \beta_n = n+\tfrac{1}{2},\\[6pt]
Q &=  \frac{G \pi^4}{12\mu} - \frac{G}{2\pi\mu} \sum_{n=1}^\infty \frac{1}{\beta_n^5} \left[\coth (2\pi\beta_n) + \csc (2\pi\beta_n)\right].
\end{align}$$

The velocity distribution for tubes of elliptical cross-section with semiaxes a and b is

$$\begin{align}
u(y,z) &= \frac{G}{2\mu \left(\frac{1}{a^2}+\frac{1}{b^2}\right)} \left(1- \frac{y^2}{a^2} - \frac{z^2}{b^2}\right),\\[6pt]
Q &= \frac{\pi G a^3 b^3}{4\mu \left(a^2 + b^2\right)}.
\end{align}$$

Here, when a = b, Poiseuille flow for circular pipe is recovered and when a → ∞, plane Poiseuille flow is recovered. More explicit solutions with cross-sections such as snail-shaped sections, sections having the shape of a notch circle following a semicircle, annular sections between homofocal ellipses, annular sections between non-concentric circles are also available, as reviewed by Ratip Berker.

== Poiseuille flow through arbitrary cross-section ==
The flow through arbitrary cross-section u(y,z) satisfies the condition that u = 0 on the walls. The governing equation reduces to

$$\frac{\partial^2 u}{\partial y^2}+\frac{\partial^2 u}{\partial z^2} = -\frac{G}{\mu}.$$

If we introduce a new dependent variable as

$$U = u +\frac{G}{4\mu}\left(y^2+z^2\right),$$

then it is easy to see that the problem reduces to that integrating a Laplace equation

$$\frac{\partial^2 U}{\partial y^2}+\frac{\partial^2 U}{\partial z^2}=0$$

satisfying the condition

$$U = \frac{G}{4\mu}\left(y^2+z^2\right)$$

on the wall.

== Poiseuille's equation for an ideal isothermal gas ==
For a compressible fluid in a tube the volumetric flow rate Q(x) and the axial velocity are not constant along the tube; but the mass flow rate is constant along the tube length. The volumetric flow rate is usually expressed at the outlet pressure. As fluid is compressed or expanded, work is done and the fluid is heated or cooled. This means that the flow rate depends on the heat transfer to and from the fluid. For an ideal gas in the isothermal case, where the temperature of the fluid is permitted to equilibrate with its surroundings, an approximate relation for the pressure drop can be derived. Using ideal gas equation of state for constant temperature process (i.e., $p/\rho$ is constant) and the conservation of mass flow rate (i.e., $\dot m=\rho Q$ is constant), the relation Qp = Q_{1}p_{1} = Q_{2}p_{2} can be obtained. Over a short section of the pipe, the gas flowing through the pipe can be assumed to be incompressible so that Poiseuille law can be used locally,

$$-\frac{\mathrm{d}p}{\mathrm{d}x} = \frac{8\mu Q}{\pi  R^4} = \frac{8\mu Q_2p_2}{\pi p R^4} \quad \Rightarrow \quad  -p\frac{\mathrm{d}p}{\mathrm{d}x} =  \frac{8\mu Q_2p_2}{\pi R^4}.$$

Here we assumed the local pressure gradient is not too great to have any compressibility effects. Though locally we ignored the effects of pressure variation due to density variation, over long distances these effects are taken into account. Since μ is independent of pressure, the above equation can be integrated over the length L to give

$$p_1^2-p_2^2 = \frac{16 \mu L Q_2 p_2}{\pi R^4}.$$

Hence the volumetric flow rate at the pipe outlet is given by

$$Q_2 =\frac{\pi R^4}{16 \mu L} \left( \frac{ p_1^2-p_2^2}{p_2}\right) = \frac{\pi R^4 \left( p_1-p_2\right)}{8 \mu L}  \frac{\left( p_1+p_2\right)}{2 p_2}.$$

This equation can be seen as Poiseuille's law with an extra correction factor (p_{1} + p_{2})/2p_{2} expressing the average pressure relative to the outlet pressure.

== Electrical circuits analogy ==
Electricity was originally understood to be a kind of fluid. This hydraulic analogy is still conceptually useful for understanding circuits. This analogy is also used to study the frequency response of fluid-mechanical networks using circuit tools, in which case the fluid network is termed a hydraulic circuit. Poiseuille's law corresponds to Ohm's law for electrical circuits, V = IR. Since the net force acting on the fluid is equal to ΔF = SΔp, where S = πr^{2}, i.e. ΔF = πr^{2} ΔP, then from Poiseuille's law, it follows that

$$\Delta F = \frac{8 \mu LQ}{r^2}$$.

For electrical circuits, let n be the concentration of free charged particles (in m^{−3}) and let q* be the charge of each particle (in coulombs). (For electrons, q* = e = 1.6×10^{−19} C.) Then nQ is the number of particles in the volume Q, and nQq* is their total charge. This is the charge that flows through the cross section per unit time, i.e. the current I. Therefore, I = nQq*. Consequently, Q = I/nq*, and

$$\Delta F = \frac{8 \mu LI}{nr^2 q^*}.$$

But ΔF = Eq, where q is the total charge in the volume of the tube. The volume of the tube is equal to πr^{2}L, so the number of charged particles in this volume is equal to nπr^{2}L, and their total charge is q = nπr^{2} Lq*. Since the voltage V = EL, it follows then

$$V = \frac{8\mu LI}{n^2\pi r^4 \left(q^*\right)^2}.$$

This is exactly Ohm's law, where the resistance R = V/I is described by the formula

$$R = \frac{8\mu L}{n^2\pi r^4 \left(q^*\right)^2}$$.

It follows that the resistance R is proportional to the length L of the resistor, which is true. However, it also follows that the resistance R is inversely proportional to the fourth power of the radius r, i.e. the resistance R is inversely proportional to the second power of the cross section area S = πr^{2} of the resistor, which is different from the electrical formula. The electrical relation for the resistance is

$$R=\frac{\rho L}{S},$$

where ρ is the resistivity; i.e. the resistance R is inversely proportional to the cross section area S of the resistor. The reason why Poiseuille's law leads to a different formula for the resistance R is the difference between the fluid flow and the electric current. Electron gas is inviscid, so its velocity does not depend on the distance to the walls of the conductor. The resistance is due to the interaction between the flowing electrons and the atoms of the conductor. Therefore, Poiseuille's law and the hydraulic analogy are useful only within certain limits when applied to electricity. Both Ohm's law and Poiseuille's law illustrate transport phenomena.

== Medical applications – intravenous access and fluid delivery ==
The Hagen–Poiseuille equation is useful in determining the vascular resistance and hence flow rate of intravenous (IV) fluids that may be achieved using various sizes of peripheral and central cannulas. The equation states that flow rate is proportional to the radius to the fourth power, meaning that a small increase in the internal diameter of the cannula yields a significant increase in flow rate of IV fluids. The radius of IV cannulas is typically measured in "gauge", which is inversely proportional to the radius. Peripheral IV cannulas are typically available as (from large to small) 14G, 16G, 18G, 20G, 22G, 26G. As an example, assuming cannula lengths are equal, the flow of a 14G cannula is 1.73 times that of a 16G cannula, and 4.16 times that of a 20G cannula. It also states that flow is inversely proportional to length, meaning that longer lines have lower flow rates. This is important to remember as in an emergency, many clinicians favor shorter, larger catheters compared to longer, narrower catheters. While of less clinical importance, an increased change in pressure (∆p) — such as by pressurizing the bag of fluid, squeezing the bag, or hanging the bag higher (relative to the level of the cannula) — can be used to speed up flow rate. It is also useful to understand that viscous fluids will flow slower (e.g. in blood transfusion). Delivery of fluids such as antibiotics or analgesics by means of an elastomeric pump can also be understood in terms of a Poiseuille-flow model.

== See also ==
- Couette flow
- Darcy's law
- Pipe flow
- Pulse
- Wave
- Hydraulic circuit
- Ostroumov flow
