= Couette =

Couette may refer to:

- Maurice Couette (1858–1943), French physicist, especially concerning viscous fluids
- Couette flow, fluid dynamics of viscous fluid between two surfaces
  - Stokes-Couette flow, where one surface is oscillating
  - Taylor–Couette flow, between two rotating cylinders
