= Malmuth =

Origin
- Meaning: "teacher"

Other names
- Variant forms: Melamed and variants

Malmuth is a Jewish surname meaning "teacher" in the Hebrew Language. It is a variant of the surname, Melamed, see the latter page for other variants. Malmuth is also an uncommon given

== Background, origin and meaning of Malamud ==
The surname Malamud is of Ashkenazi Jewish origin, derived from the German words "mal" meaning "time" or "occasion" and "mud" which is believed to be a corruption of "Gutmann," a personal name meaning "good man." Thus, Malamud can be interpreted as "good man of the time" or "good man on occasion," likely used as an epithet for someone considered virtuous or righteous. It emerged as a fixed surname in the 18th and 19th centuries as Jewish communities in Europe adopted hereditary surnames. Associated names might include Gutmann, Malamut, or other variations reflecting regional pronunciations.

People with the surname include:

- Bruce Malmuth (1934–2005), American film Director, brother of Gail, Daniel, and Norman Malmuth
- Mason Malmuth, American poker player and writer
- Norman Malmuth (1931–2007), American Aeronautical Scientist, brother of Gail, Bruce, and Daniel Malmuth
- Daniel S. Malmuth (1944) American Film Producer and Government Public Official, brother of Gail, Bruce, Daniel, and Norman D. Malmuth
- Gail D. Malmuth (1950) American Film Producer, and Chanel Executive, sister of Bruce, Daniel, and Norman D. Malmuth
