= Taylor number =

Quantity in fluid dynamics

In fluid dynamics, the Taylor number (Ta) is a dimensionless quantity that characterizes the importance of centrifugal "forces" or so-called inertial forces due to rotation of a fluid about an axis, relative to viscous forces.

In 1923 Geoffrey Ingram Taylor introduced this quantity in his article on the stability of flow.

The typical context of the Taylor number is in characterization of the Couette flow between rotating colinear cylinders or rotating concentric spheres. In the case of a system which is not rotating uniformly, such as the case of cylindrical Couette flow, where the outer cylinder is stationary and the inner cylinder is rotating, inertial forces will often tend to destabilize a system, whereas viscous forces tend to stabilize a system and damp out perturbations and turbulence.

On the other hand, in other cases the effect of rotation can be stabilizing. For example, in the case of cylindrical Couette flow with positive Rayleigh discriminant, there are no axisymmetric instabilities. Another example is a bucket of water that is rotating uniformly (i.e. undergoing solid body rotation). Here the fluid is subject to the Taylor-Proudman theorem which says that small motions will tend to produce purely two-dimensional perturbations to the overall rotational flow. However, in this case the effects of rotation and viscosity are usually characterized by the Ekman number and the Rossby number rather than by the Taylor number.

There are various definitions of the Taylor number which are not all equivalent, but most commonly it is given by

$$\mathrm{Ta}=\frac{4\Omega^2 R^4}{\nu^2}$$

where $\Omega$ is a characteristic angular velocity, R is a characteristic linear dimension perpendicular to the rotation axis, and $\nu$ is the kinematic viscosity.

In the case of inertial instability such as Taylor–Couette flow, the Taylor number is mathematically analogous to the Grashof number which characterizes the strength of buoyant forces relative to viscous forces in convection. When the former exceeds the latter by a critical ratio, convective instability sets in. Likewise, in various systems and geometries, when the Taylor number exceeds a critical value, inertial instabilities set in, sometimes known as Taylor instabilities, which may lead to Taylor vortices or cells.

A Taylor–Couette flow describes the fluid behavior between 2 concentric cylinders in rotation. A textbook definition of the Taylor number is

$$\mathrm{Ta}=\frac{\Omega^2 R_1(R_2-R_1)^3}{\nu^2}$$

where R_{1} is the external radius of the internal cylinder, and R_{2} is the internal radius of the external cylinder.

The critical Ta is about 1700.
