= Taylor dispersion =

Effective diffusion of a substance enhanced by shear flow, studied in fluid dynamics

Taylor dispersion or Taylor diffusion or Shear-induced dispersion is an apparent or effective diffusion of some scalar field arising on the large scale due to the presence of a strong, confined, zero-mean shear flow on the small scale. Essentially, the shear acts to smear out the concentration distribution in the direction of the flow, enhancing the rate at which it spreads in that direction. The effect is named after the British fluid dynamicist G. I. Taylor, who described the shear-induced dispersion for large Peclet numbers. The analysis was later generalized by Rutherford Aris for arbitrary values of the Peclet number, and hence the process is sometimes also referred to as Taylor-Aris dispersion.

The canonical example is that of a simple diffusing species in uniform Poiseuille flow through a uniform circular pipe with no-flux boundary conditions, but is relevant in many other contexts, including the spread of pollutants in rivers and of drugs in blood flow and rivulet flow.

== Description ==
We use z as an axial coordinate and r as the radial coordinate, and assume axisymmetry. The pipe has radius a, and the fluid velocity is:

$$\boldsymbol{u} = w\hat{\boldsymbol{z}} = w_0 (1-r^2/a^2) \hat{\boldsymbol{z}}$$

The concentration of the diffusing species is denoted c and its diffusivity is D. The concentration is assumed to be governed by the linear advection–diffusion equation:

$$\frac{\partial c}{\partial t} + \boldsymbol{w} \cdot \boldsymbol{\nabla} c = D \nabla^2 c$$

The concentration and velocity are written as the sum of a cross-sectional average (indicated by an overbar) and a deviation (indicated by a prime), thus:

$$w(r) = \bar{w} + w'(r)$$
$$c(r,z) = \bar{c}(z) + c'(r,z)$$

Under some assumptions (see below), it is possible to derive an equation just involving the average quantities:

$$\frac{\partial \bar{c}}{\partial t} + \bar{w} \frac{\partial \bar{c}}{\partial z} = D \left( 1 + \frac{a^2 \bar{w}^2}{48 D^2} \right) \frac{\partial^2 \bar{c}}{\partial z ^2}$$

Observe how the effective diffusivity multiplying the derivative on the right hand side is greater than the original value of diffusion coefficient, D. The effective diffusivity is often written as:

$$D_{\mathrm{eff}} = D \left( 1 + \frac{\mathit{Pe}^{2}}{48} \right)\, ,$$

where $\mathit{Pe}=a\bar{w}/D$ is the Péclet number, based on the channel radius $a$. The interesting result is that for large values of the Péclet number, the effective diffusivity is inversely proportional to the molecular diffusivity. The effect of Taylor dispersion is therefore more pronounced at higher Péclet numbers.

In a frame moving with the mean velocity, i.e., by introducing $\xi=z-\bar w t$, the dispersion process becomes a purely diffusion process,

$$\frac{\partial \bar{c}}{\partial t}  = D_{\mathrm{eff}}\frac{\partial^2 \bar{c}}{\partial \xi ^2}$$

with diffusivity given by the effective diffusivity.

The assumption is that $c' \ll \bar{c}$ for given $z$, which is the case if the length scale in the $z$ direction is long enough to smooth the gradient in the $r$ direction. This can be translated into the requirement that the length scale $L$ in the $z$ direction satisfies:

$$L \gg \frac{a^2}{D} \bar w = a\mathit{Pe}$$.

Dispersion is also a function of channel geometry. An interesting phenomenon for example is that the dispersion of a flow between two infinite flat plates and a rectangular channel, which is infinitely thin, differs approximately 8.75 times. Here the very small side walls of the rectangular channel have an enormous influence on the dispersion.

While the exact formula will not hold in more general circumstances, the mechanism still applies, and the effect is stronger at higher Péclet numbers. Taylor dispersion is of particular relevance for flows in porous media modelled by Darcy's law.

== Derivation ==
One may derive the Taylor equation using method of averages, first introduced by Aris. The result can also be derived from large-time asymptotics, which is more intuitively clear. In the dimensional coordinate system $(x',r',\theta)$, consider the fully-developed Poiseuille flow $u=2 U [1-(r'/a)^2]$ flowing inside a pipe of radius $a$, where $U$ is the average velocity of the fluid. A species of concentration $c$ with some arbitrary distribution is to be released at somewhere inside the pipe at time $t'=0$. As long as this initial distribution is compact, for instance the species/solute is not released everywhere with finite concentration level, the species will be convected along the pipe with the mean velocity $U$. In a frame moving with the mean velocity and scaled with following non-dimensional scales

$$t=\frac{t'}{a^2/D},\quad x=\frac{x'-Ut'}{a}, \quad r=\frac{r'}{a}, \quad Pe = \frac{Ua}{D}$$

where $a^2/D$ is the time required for the species to diffuse in the radial direction, $D$ is the diffusion coefficient of the species and $Pe$ is the Peclet number, the governing equations are given by

$$\frac{\partial c}{\partial t}+ Pe(1-2r^2)\frac{\partial c}{\partial x} =\frac{\partial^2 c }{\partial x^2} + \frac{1}{r}\frac{\partial }{\partial r}\left(r\frac{\partial c}{\partial r}\right).$$

Thus in this moving frame, at times $t\sim 1$ (in dimensional variables, $t'\sim a^2/D$), the species will diffuse radially. It is clear then that when $t\gg 1$ (in dimensional variables, $t'\gg a^2/D$), diffusion in the radial direction will make the concentration uniform across the pipe, although however the species is still diffusing in the $x$ direction. Taylor dispersion quantifies this axial diffusion process for large $t$.

Suppose $t\sim 1/\epsilon \gg 1$ (i.e., times large in comparison with the radial diffusion time $a^2/D$), where $\epsilon \ll 1$ is a small number. Then at these times, the concentration would spread to an axial extent $x\sim \sqrt t\sim \sqrt{1/\epsilon}\gg 1$. To quantify large-time behavior, the following rescalings

$$\tau = \epsilon t, \quad \xi = \sqrt\epsilon x$$

can be introduced. The equation then becomes

$$\epsilon\frac{\partial c}{\partial \tau}+ \sqrt\epsilon Pe(1-2r^2)\frac{\partial c}{\partial \xi} =\epsilon \frac{\partial^2 c }{\partial \xi^2} + \frac{1}{r}\frac{\partial }{\partial r}\left(r\frac{\partial c}{\partial r}\right).$$

If pipe walls do not absorb or react with the species, then the boundary condition $\partial c/\partial r=0$ must be satisfied at $r=1$. Due to symmetry, $\partial c/\partial r=0$ at $r=0$.

Since $\epsilon \ll 1$, the solution can be expanded in an asymptotic series, $c=c_0 + \sqrt\epsilon c_1 +\epsilon c_2 + \cdots$ Substituting this series into the governing equation and collecting terms of different orders will lead to series of equations. At leading order, the equation obtained is

$$\frac{1}{r}\frac{\partial }{\partial r}\left(r\frac{\partial c_0}{\partial r}\right)=0.$$

Integrating this equation with boundary conditions defined before, one finds $c_0=c_0(\xi,\tau)$. At this order, $c_0$ is still an unknown function. This fact that $c_0$ is independent of $r$ is an expected result since as already said, at times $t'\gg a^2/D$, the radial diffusion will dominate first and make the concentration uniform across the pipe.

Terms of order $\sqrt\epsilon$ leads to the equation

$$\frac{1}{r}\frac{\partial }{\partial r}\left(r\frac{\partial c_1}{\partial r}\right)=Pe (1-2r^2)\frac{\partial c_0}{\partial \xi}.$$

Integrating this equation with respect to $r$ using the boundary conditions leads to

$$c_1(\xi,r,\tau) = c_{1a}(\xi,\tau) + \frac{Pe}{8}(2r^2-r^4)\frac{\partial c_0}{\partial \xi}$$

where $c_{1a}$ is the value of $c_1$ at $r=0$, an unknown function at this order.

Terms of order $\epsilon$ leads to the equation

$$\frac{1}{r}\frac{\partial }{\partial r}\left(r\frac{\partial c_2}{\partial r}\right)=Pe (1-2r^2)\frac{\partial c_1}{\partial \xi} + \frac{\partial c_0}{\partial \tau} - \frac{\partial^2 c_0}{\partial \xi^2}.$$

This equation can also be integrated with respect to $r$, but what is required is the solvability condition of the above equation. The solvability condition is obtained by multiplying the above equation by $2r dr$ and integrating the whole equation from $r=0$ to $r=1$. This is also the same as averaging the above equation over the radial direction. Using the boundary conditions and results obtained in the previous two orders, the solvability condition leads to

$$\frac{\partial c_0}{\partial \tau} =\left(1+\frac{Pe^2}{48}\right) \frac{\partial^2 c_0}{\partial \xi^2} \quad \Rightarrow \quad \frac{\partial c_0}{\partial t} =\left(1+\frac{Pe^2}{48}\right) \frac{\partial^2 c_0}{\partial x^2}.$$

This is the required diffusion equation. Going back to the laboratory frame and dimensional variables, the equation becomes

$$\frac{\partial c_0}{\partial t'} + U \frac{\partial c_0}{\partial x'} =D\left(1+\frac{U^2 a^2}{48 D^2}\right) \frac{\partial^2 c_0}{\partial x'^2}.$$

By the way in which this equation is derived, it can be seen that this is valid for $t'\gg a^2/D$ in which $c_0$ changes significantly over a length scale $x'\gg a$ (or more precisely on a scale $x\sim \sqrt{Dt'})$. At the same time scale $t'\gg a^2/D$, at any small length scale about some location that moves with the mean flow, say $x'-Ut'=x_s'-Ut'$, i.e., on the length scale $x'-x_s'\sim a$, the concentration is no longer independent of $r$, but is given by $c=c_0 + \sqrt{\epsilon} c_1.$

=== Higher order asymptotics ===
Integrating the equations obtained at the second order, we find

$$c_2(\xi,\tau) = c_{2a}(\xi,\tau) + \frac{Pe}{4}\left(r^2-\frac{r^4}{2}\right) \frac{\partial c_{1a}}{\partial\xi} + \frac{Pe^2}{32}\left(\frac{r^2}{6}+\frac{r^4}{2}-\frac{5r^6}{8}+\frac{r^8}{8}\right) \frac{\partial^2c_0}{\partial\xi^2}$$

where $c_{2a}(\xi,\tau)$ is an unknown at this order.

Now collecting terms of order $\epsilon\sqrt\epsilon$, we find

$$\frac{1}{r}\frac{\partial }{\partial r}\left(r\frac{\partial c_3}{\partial r}\right)=Pe (1-2r^2)\frac{\partial c_2}{\partial \xi} + \frac{\partial c_1}{\partial \tau} - \frac{\partial^2 c_1}{\partial \xi^2}.$$

The solvability condition of the above equation yields the governing equation for $c_{1a}(\xi,\tau)$ as follows

$$\frac{\partial c_{1a}}{\partial \tau} -\left(1+\frac{Pe^2}{48}\right) \frac{\partial^2 c_{1a}}{\partial \xi^2} = -\frac{Pe^3}{2880}\frac{\partial^3c_0}{\partial\xi^3}.$$

== Generalization to other flows ==
The shear dispersion for oscillatory flows was studied by E. J. Watson and L. B. Progozhin. The concept of shear dispersion accounting for the effect of variable fluid properties such as density, viscosity and diffusivity is generalized recently. The concept of shear dispersion can be generalised to spatio-temporal periodic flows. Extension to Ostroumov flows is due to M. Emin Erdogan and Phillip C. Chatwin.

== See also ==
- Erdogan–Chatwin equation

== Other sources ==
- Aris, R. (1956). "On the dispersion of a solute in a fluid flowing through a tube". Proceedings of the Royal Society of London, Series A. 235 (1200): 67–77. Bibcode:1956RSPSA.235...67A. doi:10.1098/rspa.1956.0065. S2CID 95229777.
- Frankel, I.; Brenner, H. (1989). "On the foundations of generalized Taylor dispersion theory". Journal of Fluid Mechanics. 204: 97. Bibcode:1989JFM...204...97F. doi:10.1017/S0022112089001679. S2CID 123719494.
- Taylor, Geoffrey (1953). "Dispersion of soluble matter in solvent flowing slowly through a tube". Proceedings of the Royal Society of London, Series A. 219 (1137): 186–203. Bibcode:1953RSPSA.219..186T. doi:10.1098/rspa.1953.0139. S2CID 97372019.
- Taylor, Geoffrey (1954). "The dispersion of matter in turbulent flow through a pipe". Proceedings of the Royal Society of London, Series A. 223 (1155): 446–468. Bibcode:1954RSPSA.223..446T. doi:10.1098/rspa.1954.0130. S2CID 96182418.
- Taylor, Geoffrey (1954). "Conditions under which dispersion of a solute in a stream of solvent can be used to measure molecular diffusion". Proceedings of the Royal Society of London, Series A. 225 (1163): 473–477. Bibcode:1954RSPSA.225..473T. doi:10.1098/rspa.1954.0216. S2CID 97701431.
- Brenner, H. (1980). "Dispersion resulting from flow through spatially periodic porous media". Philosophical Transactions of the Royal Society of London, Series A. 297 (1430): 81–133. Bibcode:1980RSPTA.297...81B. doi:10.1098/rsta.1980.0205. S2CID 121853893.
- Mestel. J. Taylor dispersion — shear augmented diffusion, Lecture Handout for Course M4A33, Imperial College.
