= Nighthawks (1981 film) =

1981 film by Bruce Malmuth

- Theatrical release poster
- Directed by: Bruce Malmuth
- Screenplay by: David Shaber
- Story by: David Shaber; Paul Sylbert
- Produced by: Martin Poll; Daniel S. Malmuth
- Starring: Sylvester Stallone; Billy Dee Williams; Lindsay Wagner; Persis Khambatta; Nigel Davenport; Rutger Hauer
- Cinematography: James A. Contner
- Edited by: Christopher Holmes; Stanford C. Allen
- Music by: Keith Emerson
- Production companies: Martin Poll Productions; The Production Company
- Distributed by: Universal Pictures
- Release date: April 10, 1981 (US)
- Running time: 99 minutes
- Country: United States
- Language: English
- Budget: $5 million
- Box office: $19.9 million

Nighthawks is a 1981 American neo-noir action thriller film directed by Bruce Malmuth in his solo directorial debut, from a screenplay by David Shaber, based on a story by Shaber and Paul Sylbert. It stars Sylvester Stallone and Billy Dee Williams, with Lindsay Wagner, Persis Khambatta, Nigel Davenport and Rutger Hauer in his American film debut. Its score was composed by Keith Emerson.

The film follows Wulfgar Reinhardt and Shakka, a pair of international terrorists who come to New York City and the police detectives who, as part of a newly formed antiterrorism squad, are asked to identify and neutralize them.

Nighthawks was noted for production problems, including the firing of original director Gary Nelson, and extensive re-editing by star Stallone. The film was released by Universal Pictures on April 10, 1981; it received generally positive reviews and was a financial success, grossing $19.9 million on a $5 million production budget.

== Plot ==
Three armed assailants attack a woman who turns out to be NYPD Detective Sergeant Deke DaSilva of the Street Crimes Unit in disguise. His partner, Detective Sergeant Matthew Fox, immobilizes two of the assailants; Deke chases the third upstairs to a subway-station platform, taunts him, and incapacitates him with a scarf. DaSilva and Fox then serve a high-risk warrant in the Bronx. They raid a drug-distribution spot, where they discover corrupt police officers among the dealers. After the arrests, DaSilva meets his estranged wife, Irene, and tells her he loves her. Although she initially rebuffs his advances, they eventually reconcile.

That same day in London, terrorist-for-hire Heymar "Wulfgar" Reinhardt bombs a department store. Later, he meets Kenna, a member of his network, at a party to receive travel documents and money. Suspicious of the delivery man, Wulfgar kills him and three Metropolitan Police Service officers sent to arrest him. He escapes, and the police superintendent berates lead investigator Inspector Peter Hartman. In Paris, Wulfgar meets his partner, Shakka, and learns that his handlers are ostracizing him because the bombing killed a number of children. Wulfgar undergoes facial surgery to alter his appearance and decides to move his terrorist campaign to New York City.

NYPD Lt. Munafo transfers DaSilva and Fox to the newly formed joint Anti-Terrorist Action Command (ATAC) squad, where they meet Hartman. Hartman and DaSilva clash, since Hartman believes that American police are not ruthless enough to deal with a terrorist such as Wulfgar. Although he hesitates to condone killing Wulfgar, DaSilva absorbs his new training and begins to understand the terrorist.

In New York City, Wulfgar moves in with Pam, a flight attendant, and kills her when she discovers his arsenal. Acting on a tip, Munafo orders DaSilva and Fox to search every nightclub Pam had visited. They find Wulfgar in a nightclub, and after a shootout and foot chase through the subway, Wulfgar first takes a woman hostage and uses her as a human shield, preventing DaSilva from shooting. Wulfgar then escapes by slashing Fox's face with a knife, enraging DaSilva, who vows to kill Wulfgar. At the hospital, Fox admonishes DaSilva for not shooting.

The ATAC squad guards a United Nations function at the Metropolitan Museum of Art. Shakka, infiltrating the party in disguise, corners Hartman on an escalator and kills him. After hijacking a Roosevelt Island Tramway car, Wulfgar executes Suzanne Marigny, the wife of French ambassador Rene, while DaSilva watches from a hovering police helicopter. Wulfgar demands that DaSilva board the tramway to receive an infant that he wishes to be taken to safety. DaSilva is winched up to the aerial tram and confronts Wulfgar, demanding to know why Wulfgar killed Suzanne. Wulfgar says that he killed her because he wanted to; considering himself a speaker for people who cannot speak for themselves, he says that all people are victims.

The police agree to Wulfgar's demands for a bus to escort the hostages and him to an airport, where a jet will be waiting. Wulfgar and Shakka hide among the hostages. As they board the bus, DaSilva plays a hidden recording of a Hartman lecture denouncing Shakka. Shakka, enraged, breaks away from the hostages and Fox shoots her with a sniper rifle. Wulfgar escapes by driving the bus off a ramp into the East River, but after searching the area, the police cannot find him.

At Wulfgar's safe house, ATAC finds detailed information on the individual team members and Irene. Wulfgar breaks into Irene's home, tracking her into the kitchen as she does dishes. As he sneaks up behind her to kill her, "Irene" suddenly turns to face Wulfgar, revealing DaSilva in disguise. As DaSilva aims his revolver at Wulfgar, Wulfgar lunges at him. DaSilva fires twice at the terrorist, sending his body crashing into the street. DaSilva walks out of the house and sits beside Wulfgar's lifeless body on the front steps of Irene's house.

== Cast ==
- Sylvester Stallone as Detective Sergeant Deke DaSilva, NYPD
- Billy Dee Williams as Detective Sergeant Matthew Fox, NYPD
- Lindsay Wagner as Irene DaSilva
- Rutger Hauer as Heymar "Wulfgar" Reinhardt
- Persis Khambatta as Shakka
- Nigel Davenport as Inspector Peter Hartman, MPS
- Hilary Thompson as Pam
- Joe Spinell as Lieutenant Munafo, NYPD
- Walter Mathews as NY Police Commissioner
- Robert Pugh as Kenna
- Brian Osborne as Inspector Orchard
- Frederick Treves as Chief Inspector
- Edward Fox as Atkinson
- Charles Duval as Dr. Gheslin
- Tony Munafo as Big Mike
- Yvette Hawkins as Mrs. Mtembwe
- Jamie Gillis as Designer
- Corine Lorain as Suzanne Marigny
- Jean-Pierre Stewart as Rene Marigny
- Steve Daskewisz as ATAC Officer
- Dar Robinson as ATAC Officer
- Gerard Murphy as Detective Mooney
- Catherine Mary Stewart as Salesgirl
- Jean Gilpin as MOMA Woman
- Glory Annen as Party Guest
- Jim Beaver as Subway Passenger
- John Benitez as DJ

== Production ==
=== Development and writing ===
The script by David Shaber was originally written as a third French Connection film, with Gene Hackman's Popeye Doyle teamed up with a wisecracking cop (possibly played by Richard Pryor). When Hackman was reluctant to make a third film as Doyle, the idea was scrapped; 20th Century Fox sold the script to Universal, which Shaber reworked into Nighthawks.

Paul Sylbert was given a co-story credit, and this was one of only two screenplays (the other being The Steagle) he wrote during his career, as he was mainly a production designer and director.

The film had two working titles: Attack and Hawks, and pre-production began in 1979. In preparation for their roles as New York City police officers, Billy Dee Williams and Sylvester Stallone spent several weeks working at night with the NYPD Street Crimes Unit.

=== Casting ===
Nighthawks marked the American debut of Dutch actor Rutger Hauer. To accept the role of Wulfgar Reimhardt, Hauer turned down a better-paying role in Sphinx, a 1981 adventure film directed by Franklin J. Schaffner. His mother Teunke and his best friend died during the film's production, and he returned to the Netherlands for their funerals.

The first scene Hauer filmed was his death scene, in which he was injured twice. A squib meant to simulate a gunshot exploded on the wrong side, severely burning him; a cable that yanked him (simulating the force of being shot) was pulled too hard, straining his back. Hauer later learned that the cable was pulled forcefully according to Stallone's order, and their relationship was then marked by disagreements. Although stories about their on-set arguments are still told by fans of the film and the actors, Hauer has said in interviews that he did not take the disagreements personally and the greatest problem during filming was the film's difficulty.

In a 1993 interview, Stallone praised Hauer's performance.

It was a little bit ahead of its time in that I was dealing with urban terrorism. Now, with the World Trade Center [the 1993 World Trade Center bombing], it's happening. At the time, people couldn't relate to it, and the studio [Universal] didn't believe in it. Rutger Hauer's performance held it together — he was an excellent villain.

According to Hauer, Nighthawks was a missed opportunity and the issue of international terrorism could have been handled more accurately: "We had only to play tags – the written story was much more dangerous".

Nighthawks features one of the few mainstream acting appearances of porn star Jamie Gillis, who plays Lindsay Wagner's character Irene DaSilva's boss.

=== Filming ===
Principal photography began January 1980 (when the final draft of the script was completed), and production ended in April 1980. Because of problems with Sylvester Stallone and the studio's interference in postproduction, the film was heavily re-edited and was released a year after it was finished.

The original director was Gary Nelson—who had directed the Disney films Freaky Friday (1976) and The Black Hole (1979)—but he was dismissed from the project after a week of production and was not credited. His replacement, Bruce Malmuth, had only one previous film to his credit, a segment of the 1975 portmanteau sex comedy Fore Play, though he had directed several Clio Award-winning ad campaigns. He was recommended to Stallone by Rocky director John G. Avildsen, who had worked with him on Fore Play. Malmuth's brother Daniel, who had also worked on Fore Play, was brought in as an additional producer.

Malmuth, en route from Los Angeles to New York City, was unable to make the first day of shooting after Nelson's removal, and Stallone shot a scene for one day (the chase in the subway). According to the Directors Guild of America, "Anyone signed to work on a movie before the director was engaged cannot replace a fired director, except in an emergency"; arbitration resulted in a fine.

Lindsay Wagner said in an interview that Stallone took over the film because of production problems:

He was really incredible. That film – I mean, history has shown that he's so talented in so many different ways. He had made Rocky obviously before that [directing Rocky II in 1979]. But, it was just incredible. They had some difficulties. Whatever they were, I wasn't privy to the inside information about it. We started with one director, and all of the sudden there were some problems, and Sylvester ended up having to take over the film and he ended up directing it. So just spontaneously, he just jumped into that role, and after [that] directed [it]. And, it was incredible watching him and his multitalented self whip that film into shape. It was quite educational in some ways. But, just kind of awe inspiring watching him work on so many levels at one time. That's not easy. Not many actors can do that.

The subway train used in the chase sequence was retired IND equipment, which was preserved as a museum train. Car number 1802 (the last prewar New York City Subway car built) is owned by Railway Preservation Corporation and remains in New York City, where it operates several times a year on museum fan trips with other preserved cars. Number 1802 has since been scrapped. The IND Hoyt-Schermerhorn station in Brooklyn was used as the 57th and 42nd Street stations; a Hoyt-Schermerhorn sign is briefly visible when Stallone tries to pry the doors open as the train pulls out of the station. The train ran on an unused outer track leading from the Court Street station, now the New York Transit Museum.

The London department store blown up at the beginning of the film was Arding & Hobbs in Clapham Junction, which belonged to the Allders group at the time. The store is now owned by Debenhams, and during the 2011 England riots its windows were again smashed.

=== Stunts ===
Nighthawks' stunt coordinator was Dar Robinson. Stallone insisted on performing his own stunts; according to actor Nigel Davenport in an interview for the BBC's Wogan, Stallone performed the scene in which he was winched up to the Roosevelt Island Tramway without a double. About the film's stunts, Stallone posted on the Ain't It Cool News website:

The stunts in the film were pretty extraordinary because they were invented along the way. Running through the tunnels of an un-built subway station was very dangerous, but exciting and we were only given one hour to do it. So that made for an interesting evening. Hanging from the cable car was probably one of the more dangerous stunts I was asked to perform because it was untested and I was asked to hold a folding Gerber knife in my left hand so if the cable were to snap, and I survived the 230 foot fall into the East River with its ice cold, 8-mile-an-hour current, I could cut myself free from the harness because the cable when stretched out weighed more than 300 lb. I tell you this because it's so stupid to believe that I would survive hitting the water so to go beyond that is absurd. So I actually thought the smart move would be to commit hari-kari on the way down and let the cards fold as they may. P.S. Several years later, this cable did snap while testing it on a 100-lb bag of sand.

In a 1980 interview with Roger Ebert, Stallone mentioned problems with stunts he wanted to perform himself in Nighthawks. In the scene where he jumps onto a moving train and kicks out the wire-reinforced window, the window broke easily and knocked him off balance. Stallone has had a lifelong fear of heights and said about the helicopter stunt, "I've never been so scared in my life". According to the actor, he spent 15 weeks in near-total seclusion in his hotel room between scenes and it was the most stressful time of his life.

=== Re-editing ===
Before its theatrical release, Nighthawks was edited for violence by Universal Studios and the MPAA. Among the scenes cut was a longer disco shootout, and Wulfgar's death scene was heavily trimmed. Originally, he would have been shot six times, finished off with a graphic headshot (via an animatronic head created by makeup artist Dick Smith), that was completely cut from the sequence.

Stallone also had a hand in re-editing the film. According to Frank Sanello's book, Stallone: A Rocky Life, two versions of Nighthawks were shown to test audiences, one emphasizing Stallone's character Deke DaSilva and the other emphasizing Hauer's. Although the version emphasizing Hauer was better received by audiences, Stallone removed some of Hauer's scenes from the film's final version.

Stallone posted on the Ain't It Cool News website that Nighthawks "was a very difficult film to make namely because no one believed that urban terrorism would ever happen in New York, and thus felt that the story was far-fetched. Nighthawks was an even better film before the studio lost faith in it and cut it to pieces. What was in the missing scenes was extraordinary acting by Rutger Hauer, Lindsay Wagner, and the finale was a blood fest that rivaled the finale of Taxi Driver. But it was a blood fest with a purpose".

In 2021 interview for Collider while he was promoting his new director's cut of Rocky IV (1985), Stallone said how some of his other films he would have loved to re-edit back to their original versions were Rocky V (1990), Paradise Alley (1978) and Nighthawks. He also praised the original cut of Nighthawks as superior to the final theatrical version.

== Music ==
The score for the film was composed by progressive rock musician Keith Emerson. This was one of only a handful of film scores written by Emerson, whose only prior scoring experience was Italian director Dario Argento's horror film Inferno, released the year prior.

Paulette McWilliams contributed vocals to the score. Other musicians include Greg Bowen (trumpet) and Jerome Richardson (woodwinds).

Ken Dryden of AllMusic wrote, "Although Nighthawks was a rather contrived suspense film, Keith Emerson's soundtrack fit its need rather well. With his full assortment of keyboards, an orchestra, and a supporting cast.... Emerson keeps one's interest. All in all, it stands the test of time better than the movie."

The soundtrack was released by Spirit Of Unicorn Music in 1981. It was re-released on vinyl and CD by Varèse Sarabande in 2016.

== Reception ==
=== Box office ===
The film recovered its $5-million budget worldwide, grossing $14.9 million in North America and $5 million abroad.

=== Critical response ===
Variety called the film "an exciting cops and killers yarn". In her review for The New York Times, Janet Maslin praised Hauer's performance: "Mr. Hauer's terrorist, in particular, is a sharply drawn character who acts as a driving force within the movie's scheme. Sadism and bloodlessness are his only identifiable characteristics, and yet he behaves memorably wherever he goes". Time magazine's Richard Schickel sharply criticized the film: "Nighthawks is so moronically written and directed, so entirely without wit or novelty, that there is plenty of time to wonder about its many missing explanations". In The Globe and Mail, Jay Scott wrote that the film "has a dirty job to do and does it. That is not an endorsement. Thumbscrews and cattle prods are real good at what they do, too". According to Newsweek's Jack Kroll, "This is one of those films that isn't a film but some repulsively complicated business deal". In The Washington Post, Gary Arnold described the film as "an aggressively shallow police thriller pitting New York undercover cops against international terrorists, suggests what The Day of the Jackal might have looked like if filmed by the producers of Baretta. In order to facilitate a grandstanding, harebrained heroic role assigned to Sylvester Stallone, the filmmakers brush off every opportunity for intelligent dramatization and authentic suspense that the plot would seem to possess".

The film has a 71% approval rating on the review aggregation website Rotten Tomatoes based on 24 reviews.

== Remake ==
In July 2019, a remake was announced to be in development from Balboa Productions. By May 2020, Sylvester Stallone announced that a reboot television series was then in development. The project was to be a joint-venture production between Universal Television and Balboa Productions, and would be released as a Peacock exclusive television series.
