= Captain Zoom =

Captain Zoom may refer to:

- A character from the theatrical film Zoom
- A character from the made-for-television film The Adventures of Captain Zoom in Outer Space
- 60s rock band Captain Zoom, having a hit single I Really Want You on A&M, 1965
- The main character and singer of personalized birthday songs, introduced by The American Broadcasting Company in 1976
