= Diplomatic Act =

1998 novel by Peter Jurasik and William H. Keith Jr.

- Cover of Diplomatic Act
- Author: Peter Jurasik; William H. Keith Jr.
- Cover artist: Gary Ruddell
- Language: English
- Genre: Science fiction
- Published: August 1998
- Publisher: Baen Books
- Publication place: United States
- Pages: 368
- ISBN: 0-671-87788-7
- OCLC: 42210416

Diplomatic Act is a comedy science fiction novel written by Peter Jurasik and William H. Keith Jr., published in August 1998. The novel focuses on Richard Faraday, an actor who plays an extraterrestrial diplomat on a science fiction television series, who is kidnapped by aliens who believe him to be the diplomat he portrays. The novel was inspired by Jurasik's role as extraterrestrial ambassador Londo Mollari in the science fiction series Babylon 5 (1993–1998).

== Plot ==
Richard Faraday is an actor on a science fiction television series, Star Peace. He plays Harmon the Eldar, an extraterrestrial diplomat who is both kind and wise. An alien group of watchers, called the Kluj, who have been observing mankind through their television broadcasts for decades, do not understand the distinction between fact and fiction (in fact the concept of fiction might be a uniquely human concept) and kidnap Faraday as they believe him to be Harmon and they are in need of his diplomatic services.

The Kluj need Faraday to solve a metaphilosophical crisis and avert a galactic war. While Faraday is trying to sort out the galactic crisis, a Kluj takes Faraday's place on the set of Star Peace and learns about the difference between fiction and reality and how Hollywood works. This Kluj has to team up with Faraday to defeat the evil plans of one of the Elder Races wandering around the galaxy.

== Development ==
The lead character in the novel, Faraday, who is an actor on a science fiction television show where he plays an extraterrestrial diplomat, bears some similarity to author Jurasik, as Jurasik played extraterrestrial ambassador Londo Mollari in the science fiction series Babylon 5 (1993–1998). The novel was completed during Jurasik's final year on Babylon 5 and the cover illustration by Gary Ruddell features a character resembling Mollari. Co-author William H. Keith Jr. is the writer of a number of science fiction novel series including the Warstrider series.

The book is similar in tone and story to Galaxy Quest, which was released one year later. It also bears similarities to the 1995 science fiction/comedy television film The Adventures of Captain Zoom in Outer Space, as well as John Scalzi's Redshirts published in 2012.

== Reception ==
Publishers Weekly reviewed that novel calling it a "lightly entertaining story" that "moves briskly and includes fast action".

== See also ==
- Galaxy Quest – a comedy film about aliens that mistake science fiction actors for their characters, an affectionate parody of Star Trek.
- Redshirts – a comedy novel about life on board a spaceship where wearing a red shirt can prove fatal, parodies Star Trek.
- The Adventures of Captain Zoom in Outer Space – a comedy TV film about an actor who is mistaken for the character he plays, parodies Captain Video.
- Three Amigos – a comedy film about three silent film actors who are mistaken for their characters by the people of a small Mexican village.
