= Hard to Kill =

1990 film by Bruce Malmuth

- Theatrical release poster
- Directed by: Bruce Malmuth
- Written by: Steven McKay
- Produced by: Gary Adelson; Joel Simon; Bill Todman, Jr.
- Starring: Steven Seagal; Kelly LeBrock; Bill Sadler; Frederick Coffin
- Cinematography: Matthew F. Leonetti
- Edited by: John F. Link
- Music by: David Michael Frank
- Production company: Lee Rich Productions
- Distributed by: Warner Bros.
- Release date: February 9, 1990
- Running time: 95 minutes
- Country: United States
- Language: English
- Budget: $11.5 million
- Box office: $75 million

Hard to Kill is a 1990 American vigilante action-thriller film directed by Bruce Malmuth, written by Steven McKay, and starring Steven Seagal, Kelly LeBrock, William Sadler and Frederick Coffin. Seagal's second film after Above the Law, he portrays Mason Storm, a detective who falls into a coma after being shot during a home invasion that killed his wife. Reawakening seven years later, Storm embarks on a journey to avenge the death of his wife, and expose the corruption of Senator Vernon Trent, the man who ordered the murder of his family. The film was released by Warner Bros. Pictures on February 9, 1990, and grossed $75 million worldwide.

== Plot ==
In 1983, LAPD IA detective Mason Storm investigates a mob meeting held by a pier. He records a shadowy figure who assures the mob they can rely on his political support. Unaware that he is monitored by corrupt cops, he informs his partner, Becker, and his friend, Lt. O'Malley, that he has evidence of corruption.

Mason hides the videotape in his house. When he goes upstairs, a hit squad composed of corrupt policemen, including Jack Axel and Max Quentero, breaks in, murders Mason's wife, and shoots him. Mason's young son, Sonny, escapes through a window. The corrupt policemen frame Mason, making it look like a murder-suicide. At the same time, assassins kill Mason's partner. Later at the hospital, Mason is pronounced dead but is then discovered to be alive, although in a coma. To prevent the assassins from finishing the job, Lieutenant O'Malley tells the medics to keep Mason's status a secret.

Seven years later, Mason wakes from his coma. Andy Stewart, one of his nurses, makes a phone call, which is intercepted by corrupt police officers. They send Axel to finish the job and kill the nurses to whom Mason might have talked. Mason realizes that he is still in danger, but his muscles have atrophied to the point where he can barely move. He gets to an elevator, and when Andy sees her co-workers being killed, she helps him escape.

Andy takes Mason to a friend's house, where he uses his knowledge of acupuncture, moxibustion, and other meditation techniques to recover his strength. While training, Mason hears a commercial for Senator Vernon Trent and recognizes the voice from the pier. He contacts O'Malley, who supplies him with weapons and tells him that his son is still alive. O'Malley adopted Sonny and sent him to a private school to keep him out of danger. Mason arranges to meet O'Malley and his now-teenage son at a train station later. After O'Malley leaves, Senator Trent's men find the house and attempt to kill Andy and Mason, but they escape.

Posing as a real estate agent, Mason recovers the hidden videotape from his old house. O'Malley and Sonny arrive at the train station but are confronted by some of the Senator's men. Sonny flees with the tape, but O'Malley is killed. When Mason arrives, he sees Sonny running away from Quentero and Nolan. Mason catches up with the men and subdues Nolan. He then beats up Quentero and recognizes him as one of the men who took part in the assault on Mason's home. Mason snaps Quentero's neck, killing him. After a brief reunion with his son, he goes after Senator Trent.

Mason sneaks into the Senator's mansion and eliminates his men one by one. He fights with Axel in the billiard room and avenges his wife by jamming a broken pool cue into Axel's neck, killing him. Next, Mason strangles corrupt Capt. Hulland and breaks his neck. Mason finally confronts Senator Trent and holds him at gunpoint when the police storm the mansion. However, they reveal that they had already seen the film and knew that Mason was set up. Trent is arrested, and Mason is reunited with Andy and his son as footage from the videotape is played on the news, showing Trent making a deal with the underworld mob and emerging from the shadows.

== Cast ==
- Steven Seagal as Detective Mason Storm
- Zachary Rosencrantz as Sonny Storm
- Kelly LeBrock as Andrea "Andy" Stewart
- William Sadler as Senator Vernon Trent
- Frederick Coffin as Lieutenant Kevin O'Malley
- Andrew Bloch as Captain Dan Hulland
- Branscombe Richmond as Detective Max Quentero
- Charles Boswell as Detective Jack Axel
- James DiStefano as Detective Nolan
- Dean Norris as Sergeant Goodhart
- Bonnie Burroughs as Felicia Storm
- Lou Beatty Jr. as Detective Carl Becker
- Robert LaSardo as Punk
- Ernie Lively as LAPD Captain
- Julia Stormson as Girl in Hot-tub

== Reception ==
=== Box office ===
Hard to Kill debuted at number 1 at the U.S. box office with an opening weekend gross of $9.2 million, the biggest 3-day February opening at the time. It eventually grossed $48 million in the United States and Canada and $75 million worldwide.

=== Critical response ===
It holds a 33% approval rating on Rotten Tomatoes based on 15 reviews; the average rating is 4.1/10. Audiences polled by CinemaScore gave the film an average grade of "A−" on an A+ to F scale. Owen Gleiberman of Entertainment Weekly rated it a letter grade of D− and called Seagal as generic an actor as the film. In describing the film as "a lively one for its genre", Janet Maslin of The New York Times wrote, "Mr. Seagal is effective for both his novelty value and his ability to be both literally and figuratively disarming."

== See also ==
- Cheetah
- Ram Shastra
