= Stephen Childress =

American mathematician

William Stephen Childress
- Education: California Institute of Technology; Princeton University
- Scientific career
- Fields: Mathematics; Applied Mathematics
- Workplaces: Courant Institute of Mathematical Sciences; New York University
- Doctoral advisor: Paco Axel Lagerstrom

William Stephen Childress is an American applied mathematician, author and professor emeritus at the Courant Institute of Mathematical Sciences. He works on classical fluid mechanics, asymptotic methods and singular perturbations, geophysical fluid dynamics, magnetohydrodynamics and dynamo theory, mathematical models in biology, and locomotion in fluids. He is also a co-founder of the Courant Institute of Mathematical Sciences's Applied Mathematics Lab.

== Published books ==
- 1977: Mechanics of Swimming and Flying, online ISBN 9780511569593.
- 1978: Mathematical models in developmental biology with Jerome K. Percus, ISBN 978-1470410803
- 1987: Topics in Geophysical Fluid Dynamics: Atmospheric Dynamics, Dynamo Theory, and Climate Dynamics, with M. Ghil. Softcover ISBN 978-0-387-96475-1, eBook ISBN 978-1-4612-1052-8.
- 1995: Stretch, Twist, Fold: The Fast Dynamo with Andrew D. Gilbert, ISBN 978-3662140147, ISBN 3662140144
- 2009: An Introduction to Theoretical Fluid Mechanics, ISBN 978-0-8218-4888-3.
- 2012: Natural Locomotion in Fluids and on Surfaces Swimming, Flying, and Sliding. Edited with Anette Hosoi, William W. Schultz, Jane Wang. Hardcover ISBN 978-1-4614-3996-7, Softcover ISBN 978-1-4899-9916-0, eBook ISBN 978-1-4614-3997-4
- 2018: Construction of Steady-state Hydrodynamic Dynamos. I. Spatially Periodic Fields, ISBN 978-1378904725

== Recognition ==
- 1976 Guggenheim Fellowship for Natural Sciences, US & Canada
- 2008 Fellow of American Physical Society
