= Pentathlon (film) =

- Promotional release poster
- Directed by: Bruce Malmuth
- Written by: William Stadiem; Bruce Malmuth; Gary DeVore
- Produced by: Martin E. Caan
- Starring: Dolph Lundgren; David Soul
- Cinematography: Misha Suslov
- Edited by: Joseph Gutowski; Richard Nord
- Music by: David Spear
- Production company: Red Orm Productions / Pentathlon Productions / PFG Entertainment
- Distributed by: Live Entertainment
- Release date: July 8, 1994
- Running time: 101 minutes
- Country: United States
- Languages: English; German; Korean
- Budget: $4 million

Pentathlon is a 1994 American action thriller film directed by Bruce Malmuth, who also wrote the screenplay with Gary DeVore and William Stadiem. The film stars Dolph Lundgren as an East German Olympic gold medalist pentathlete on the run from a lethal coach (David Soul). This was the final feature film of director Bruce Malmuth before his death on June 29, 2005.

== Plot ==
After winning a gold medal for East Germany in the pentathlon in the 1988 Summer Olympics in Seoul, athlete Eric Brogar (Dolph Lundgren) flees from his abusive trainer, Heinrich Mueller (David Soul) and the Olympic team.

Eight years later, Mueller is no longer a trainer. He has become a neo-Nazi terrorist, responsible for a series of attacks on German government officials, and Mueller has discovered that Eric is in Los Angeles. Brogar had become a self-pitying boozehound until his talents were spotted by his diner-owning boss John Creese (Roger E. Mosley). Still smarting over Eric's defection, Mueller beats Eric's father Rudolph Brogar (Erik Holland) to death before flying to Los Angeles. While Eric reunites with his former girlfriend Julia Davis (Renee Coleman), who hones his endurance skills at her dad's woodland retreat, Mueller joins forces with neo-Nazi sympathizers including Eric's former rival Rhinehardt (Daniel Riordan).

At a peace rally, Mueller and his thugs plot to assassinate a rabbi and an ambassador while spreading a hate message on cable television. After viciously beating up Julia's father Vic Davis (Philip Bruns) and shooting Creese, Mueller and his thugs kidnap Eric, who retaliates by wiping out most of the neo-Nazis. Later, at another Olympic pentathlon finals, Eric not only triumphs, but he also ends up shooting Mueller dead in self-defense at the end when Mueller tries to kill him at the finish line.

== Cast ==
- Dolph Lundgren as Eric Brogar
- David Soul as Heinrich Mueller
- Roger E. Mosley as John Creese
- Renée Coleman as Julia Davis
- Evan James as Offerman
- David Drummond as Hundt
- Daniel Riordan as Rhinehardt
- Philip Bruns as Victor "Vic" Davis
- Gerald Hopkins as Christian
- Erik Holland as Rudolph Brogar
- Bruce Malmuth as Erhardt
- Mel Stewart as Olympic Athlete
- Anthony T. Pennello as Cop #1
- Barry Lynch as Horst
- Andreas Reinl as Schubert

== Release ==
The film was officially premiered on July 8, 1994.

== Reception ==
=== Critical response ===
Eoin Friel from The Action Elite gave Pentathlon 3.5 out of five stars. He praised for its originality, concluding: "Overall, If it’s wall to wall action you’re looking for then Pentathlon isn’t for you but if you’re willing to watch Dolph try something very different then it’s definitely worth a look." David Brook from Blue Print: Review gave the film three out of five stars, stating: "So, if you're a fan of cheesy 80's/90's action curios you'll probably find yourself buying into this film like I did, but if your mind ever stops to think about what you're watching you will see it for the ridiculous trash that it is." Anthony Nield from The Digital Fix gave "Pentathlon" 5 out 10, saying: "Pentathlon is an awful piece of filmmaking but that’s not to say it doesn’t entertain."
