= David Shaber =

American screenwriter

- Born: 1929; Cleveland, Ohio, United States
- Died: November 4, 1999 (aged 69–70); New York City, New York, U.S.
- Occupations: Screenwriter; Theatre producer
- Years active: 1964–1991

David Shaber (1929 – November 4, 1999) was an American screenwriter and theatre producer, who wrote the screenplays for The Warriors, Nighthawks, Rollover, Last Embrace and Flight of the Intruder. He also wrote the final draft, though uncredited, for the John McTiernan film The Hunt for Red October.

== Biography ==
Shaber was born and raised in Cleveland, Ohio, and abandoned a pre-med education for the Yale Drama School. He wrote and produced plays, and also wrote forty commissioned screenplays, eight of which were made into feature films, in the 1970s and 1980s. In the 1990s, he taught advanced screenwriting at Columbia University in New York City.

His 1980 semi-autobiographical film Those Lips, Those Eyes told the story of a 1950s touring stock theatrical company, set in the fictional Ohio town of Kempton Hills; the film starred Frank Langella and Thomas Hulce and was directed by Michael Pressman. Shaber also authored a novel based on the screenplay (Dell, 1980), though he was personally loath to call it a "novelization", as it was written from the first person perspective of its main character and contained much additional material that was either cut from the finished film or created specifically for the book.

Shaber was married to Alice Shaber, and had two daughters, Remy Shaber (dancer) and Sam Shaber (musician).

He died on November 4, 1999, at Mount Sinai Hospital in Manhattan of an aneurysm, at age 70.

Shaber was Jewish.

== Select credits ==
- Such Good Friends (1971)
- Last Embrace (1979)
- The Warriors (1979)
- Those Lips, Those Eyes (1980)
- Rollover (1981)
- Nighthawks (1981)
- The Hunt for Red October (1990) (uncredited)
- Flight of the Intruder (1991)
