= Sam Shaber =

American singer

Sam Shaber is an American singer-songwriter from New York City. Her parents were screenwriter David Shaber and artist Alice Shaber, and many of her songs, such as "Walkin' at Night," "Eldorado," and "Bomb Threat in New Rochelle," refer to New York City. Her song "All of This", also about New York City, reached No. 1 on the Quiznos Subs National In-Store Playlists in 2003.

She published three albums on her own label, Brown Chair Records.

Shaber released a pop digital EP called Sassy in 2006.

Currently, she fronts Brazilian-American rock band The Good People of Planet Earth, and previously she fronted indiepunk band The Happy Problem (albums Head Case (2011) and the happy problem (2008)) and dance-rock band The Bashful (Venture EP, 2009).

She is currently back in New York City and released a full-length album Head Case with The Happy Problem.

== Discography ==
- In the Bunker (1997)
- perfecT (1999)
- Sam*pler (2000)
- Eighty Numbered Streets (2002)
- In My Bones (2006)
- Sassy (2006)
- the happy problem (2008) – with The Happy Problem
- Venture (2009) – with The Bashful
- Head Case (2011) – with The Happy Problem
