= Saul Kaplun =

Polish-American aerodynamicist

Saul Kaplun (July 3, 1924 Lwów, Poland now Lviv, Ukraine – February 13, 1964, Pasadena, California, U.S.A.) was a Polish-American aerodynamicist at the California Institute of Technology (Caltech).

== Family ==
Kaplun was the only child of Jewish immigrants from Poland, Morris J. Kaplun (February 12, 1888 Kamenetz-Podolsk, Ukraine – ?), a textile businessman and industrialist and a prominent Zionist philanthropist beginning in the 1930s, and Betty (Bettina) Kaplun (? – 1963). Saul and his parents, who were refugees from Nazi persecution, lived in Lwów until 1939, when they fled Poland; they immigrated to New York shortly before World War II. He became a naturalized American citizen in 1944 and served in the United States Navy from 1944 to 1946.

Upon his death at age 39 of a heart attack, three months after his mother's death, Saul Kaplun left behind a grieving father, who sought to perpetuate his son's memory by endowing several educational projects in Israel and the United States.

At the dedication ceremony of one of the institutions he funded, at Tel Aviv University, Morris Kaplun himself "learned for the first time just how important a man [his son] was in his field. The late Dr. Saul Kaplun… left behind 'a roomful of manuscripts' which Prof. Paco Lagerstrom, of the California Institute of Technology, who spoke at the dedication, said contained 'a wealth of scientific ideas far outweighing his published work'."

== Career ==
Saul Kaplun received his PhD in 1954 under the advisorship of Paco Lagerstrom at the California Institute of Technology with his thesis dissertation The role of coordinate systems in boundary layer theory. Kaplun and Lagerstrom later collaborated on and published an article together and Lagerstrom edited Kaplun's papers for publication as a monograph after the latter's death.

Kaplun spent his entire academic career, a total of 20 years, at Caltech and received four degrees there. He became a research fellow in aeronautics upon completing his PhD in 1954 and was a senior research fellow in aeronautics on the Caltech faculty from 1957 until his death.

At a memorial ceremony at Caltech held that same year, Dr. Clark Blanchard Millikan, Caltech professor of aeronautics, stated, "Saul Kaplun's very special hallmark as a scientist was his unusual intuition. He lived with a problem till he 'saw' the solution. This enabled him to understand the essence of some fundamental problems but also made it difficult for others to understand his work. His work could in general not be explained by discursive reasoning; one had to make an effort to share his intuitive thinking."

In the ceremony, Millikan also noted that "Saul Kaplun's work played a decisive role in the development of applied mathematics at the California Institute." Caltech President Lee Alvin DuBridge eulogized at the same ceremony, "Saul Kaplun had a brilliant analytical and creative mind and made many profound and original contributions to the theory of fluid mechanics. He was an applied mathematician of extraordinary ability and had already won wide and admiring recognition for his work."

== Publications ==
Dr. Millikan stated at the 1964 Caltech ceremony, "Few publications bear his name as author… however, in very many publications by others the author expresses his thanks to Saul Kaplun for having contributed some fundamental ideas to the work, or states that he has used methods due to Kaplun. By now his work has won world-wide recognition among specialists."

After Kaplun's untimely death, his published papers and much of his unpublished work were edited by his former PhD advisor, Lagerstrom, and by Louis Norberg Howard of MIT and Ching-shi Liu of Caltech and were published in 1967 in book form under the title Fluid Mechanics and Singular Perturbation, a Collection of Papers by Saul Kaplun.

Kaplun's work has been cited and extolled by colleagues and authors in the field. Robert Edmund O'Malley wrote, "The work of Kaplun and Lagerstrom at Caltech in the 1950s was especially important to the development of matched expansions and its applications to fluid mechanics."

Sunil Datta wrote, "Singular perturbation method… It was left to the genius of Saul Kaplun (1957) to recognize the analogy between the theory of flow at small Reynolds number and boundary layer theory and to apply to it the singular perturbation method."

=== Articles ===
- Kaplun, Saul; Lagerstrom, P. A. (1957). "Asymptotic Expansions of Navier-Stokes Solutions for Small Reynolds Numbers". Journal of Mathematics and Mechanics. 6 (5): 585–593. JSTOR 24900496.
- Kaplun, Saul (1957). "Low Reynolds Number Flow Past a Circular Cylinder". Journal of Mathematics and Mechanics. 6 (5): 595–603. JSTOR 24900497.

=== Theses ===
EngD thesis

- Kaplun, Saul (1951). Dimensional analysis of the inflation process of parachute canopies (EngD). California Institute of Technology. doi:10.7907/25MM-HY18.

PhD Thesis

- Kaplun, Saul (1954). The role of coordinate systems in boundary layer theory (PDF) (PhD).

== Legacy ==
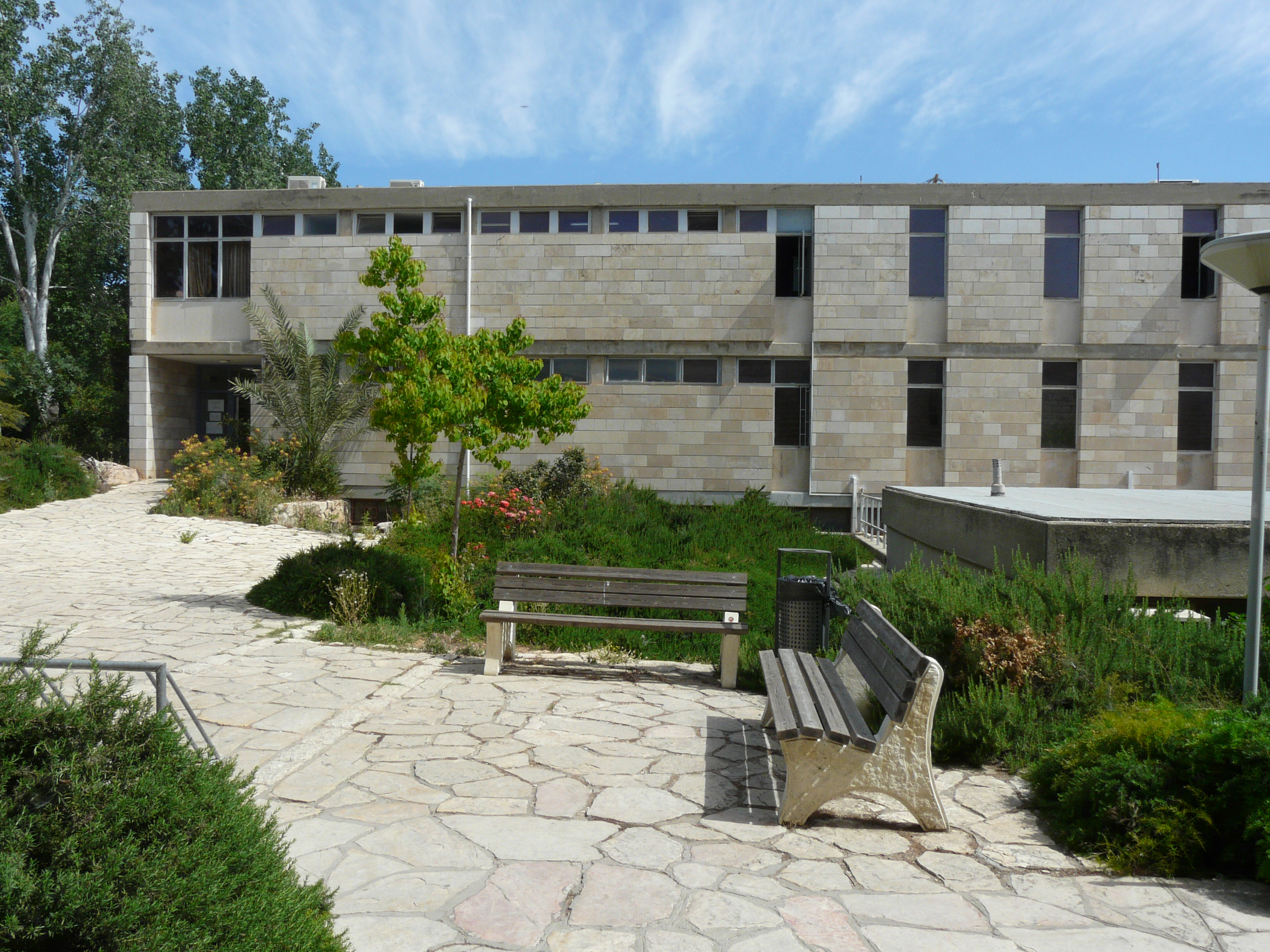
Kaplun building Hebrew University

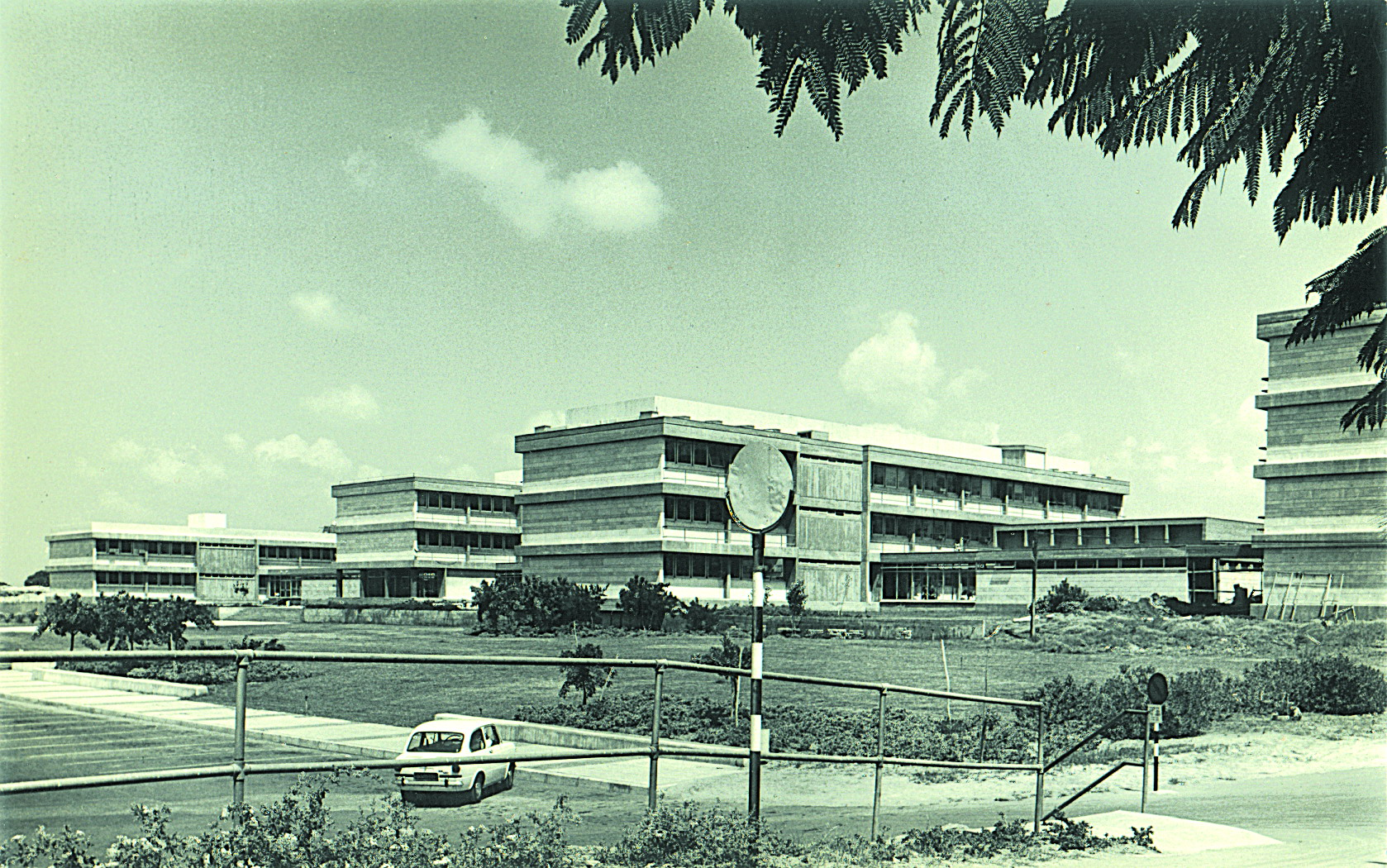
Science Faculty Tel Aviv University including Kaplun Building

Morris Kaplun's philanthropy included funding of the Saul Kaplun Institute of Applied Mathematics and Space Physics at Tel Aviv University, Israel, consecrated in February 1966, which was attended by Prof. Paco Lagerstrom and others; and of the Saul Kaplun Building for Applied Mathematics and Theoretical Physics at the Hebrew University of Jerusalem dedicated a month later in the presence of the university president, Eliahu Eilat.

Morris Kaplun also established a memorial fellowship which funds graduate research in applied mathematics and is awarded in perpetuity in his son's name at Caltech.

The father wrote a short book about his son: My Son Saul: Saul Kaplun, July 3, 1924 – February 13, 1964, in Memoriam, published in 1965.
