= Where Are the Children? =

- VHS cover
- Directed by: Bruce Malmuth
- Written by: Jack Sholder
- Based on: Where Are the Children? by Mary Higgins Clark
- Produced by: Zev Braun; Bryant Christ
- Starring: Jill Clayburgh; Max Gail; Barnard Hughes; Clifton James; Elizabeth Wilson; James Purcell; Frederic Forrest
- Cinematography: Larry Pizer
- Edited by: Roy Watts
- Music by: Sylvester Levay
- Production companies: Braun Entertainment Group; Delphi V Productions; Rastar
- Distributed by: Columbia Pictures
- Release date: November 15, 1986
- Running time: 97 minutes
- Country: United States
- Language: English
- Budget: $4 million

Where Are the Children? is a 1986 American mystery thriller film directed by Bruce Malmuth, written by Jack Sholder and starring Jill Clayburgh, Max Gail, Harley Cross, Elizabeth Wilson, Barnard Hughes and Frederic Forrest. It is based on the 1975 novel of the same name by Mary Higgins Clark.

== Plot ==
Nancy Eldridge lives in Adams Port, a town on Cape Cod, in Massachusetts. She and her husband, Clay, who is a realtor, have two kids: 6-year-old Michael and 5-year-old Missy. One of Clay's colleagues at the real estate office is Dorothy Prentiss, who is a friend of the family.

On Nancy's birthday, Nancy lets Missy and Michael go outside to play in the back yard, while she takes a shower. After getting out of the shower, Nancy goes outside to find Michael and Missy, and finds one of Missy's red mittens hanging from one of the chains that holds their swing up. Clay and Dorothy arrive at the house, and find Nancy frantic, as Michael and Missy have been kidnapped from the back yard. Clay and Nancy call the police. One of the responding officers is Adams Port police chief Ed Coffin, who begins an investigation.

The kidnapper sends Lenny Barron, a DJ at local radio station WOMR, information about Nancy's past. It's information about Nancy from when she lived in San Francisco, at a time when her hair was its natural color, and her name was Nancy Holder. Nine years ago, Nancy had two kids named Lisa and Peter, and at the time, Nancy's husband was a college professor named Carl Holder. Peter and Lisa, who were the same age that Michael and Missy now are, vanished nine years ago, and two weeks after they vanished, their bodies were found washed up on a beach near San Francisco Bay, still covered by the plastic bags that were used to suffocate them. Nancy was wrongfully accused of being the killer.

In a controversial trial, Nancy was found guilty, despite the prosecution's shaky case, and Nancy was sentenced to be executed. Carl is believed to have committed suicide a week after the trial ended. Nancy's attorney managed to get her conviction overturned. When Nancy moved to Cape Cod, wanting to get as far away from California as possible, she started dying her hair a different color. Nancy can't be put back on trial, because key witness Rob Legler, an instructor in Carl's biology department at the college, moved to Canada. Without Rob or Carl, the prosecution, which didn't have much of a case to begin with, was left without a case at all. Clay has known about Nancy's past since before they got married, and he's been supportive of her.

Having Michael, Missy, and Clay in her life had begun to help Nancy heal from the horrible pain of losing Lisa and Peter, and the pain of what the system put Nancy through. Nancy is understandably concerned about finding Michael and Missy before they get killed like Peter and Lisa were. Much to Nancy's shock, when Chief Coffin learns about Nancy's past from Lenny and Deputy Bernie Miles, Chief Coffin turns his focus on Nancy. Solely on the basis of what happened in California, Chief Coffin, in a rush to judgment, wrongfully sees Nancy as a suspect in the disappearances of Missy and Michael. For Nancy, what's happening is the return of an unbearable nightmare that she thought was over.

Clay knows that Nancy didn't do anything to any of her kids, and her therapist, Dr. Jonathan Knowles, knows that too. And then there's Courtney Parrish, a strange man who lives in an apartment on the top level of a large house known as the Lookout, and no one knows much about him. While Chief Coffin insists on suspecting Nancy of the kidnappings, he allows Dr. Knowles to question Nancy at home. Dr. Knowles helps Nancy remember that her ex-husband Carl used to have her dress like a little girl when they had sex. Carl treated her like a little girl, and did things that she didn't like. When Nancy had Peter and Lisa, Carl decided that he didn't need Nancy anymore, because she had given him two kids to set his sights on. Nancy left Carl because he had started sexually abusing Peter and Lisa.

Chief Coffin stops suspecting Nancy, and he has officers out looking for Legler, who has been spotted on Cape Cod. Once Legler is found, he provides evidence that shows that the kidnapper lured him into coming to Cape Cod so he would be implicated in the kidnappings, just in case Nancy wasn't suspected. Dorothy, who has been trying to sell the Lookout to a Greek businessman named John Kragopoulos, finds Missy's other mitten near the front steps of the Lookout, close to her car. Dorothy initially believes that Missy lost the mitten in her car during an earlier shopping trip, and that it fell out of the car when Dorothy got out to show Kragopoulos the Lookout. Kragopoulos is the first to figure out that Parrish is keeping Missy and Michael at the Lookout. Later, when Kragopoulos goes back to the Lookout, and confronts Parrish, Parrish kills Kragopoulos by hitting him in the head twice, with a fireplace shovel.

In a conversation between Nancy and Dorothy, Nancy describes the mitten that she found on the swing's chain, and Dorothy remembers the mitten that she found at the Lookout. Dorothy tells Nancy that she found it at the Lookout, and they realize that Parrish is the kidnapper. Nancy leaves to rescue Missy and Michael, while Dorothy alerts Clay and Chief Coffin. Upon confronting Parrish at the Lookout, Nancy recognizes him as her ex-husband Carl, who did not commit suicide like everyone thought he did. He had been watching Nancy for a long time, waiting for the right time to take Missy and Michael. By that time, Clay, Dr. Knowles, and Chief Coffin have arrived at the Lookout, accompanied by numerous officers.

Michael escapes, and finds Clay, while Carl takes Missy to the top of the house, to a part of the roof known as Widow's Walk. Nancy pursues them. Nancy begs Carl to give Missy back to her. A thoroughly psychopathic Carl, telling Nancy that it is her fault that he killed Peter and Lisa nine years ago, threatens to throw Missy into the water far below. Nancy grabs Missy, and tries to pull her out of Carl's grip. Clay is on his way up to Widow's Walk. Nancy tells Carl to give Missy to her. Carl falls through the wooden guard rail, and clings to a tree that is taller than the Lookout. Missy is hanging on to the edge of the roof, but Clay helps Nancy get Missy back up onto Widow's Walk. Carl gives Nancy one more look of rage, and then Carl hears a snapping sound. Carl is killed when the tree falls over, and slams him into the water. Michael, having followed Clay, reunites with Missy, Nancy, and Clay. Dr. Knowles and Chief Coffin help the four of them down off of Widow's Walk, and out of the house, with Nancy thankful that the long nightmare is finally, actually over.

== Cast ==
- Jill Clayburgh as Nancy Holder Eldridge
- Max Gail as Clay Eldridge
- Harley Cross as Michael Eldridge
- Elisabeth Harnois as Missy Eldridge
- Elizabeth Wilson as Dorothy Prentiss
- Barnard Hughes as Dr. Jonathan Knowles
- Frederic Forrest as Courtney Parrish / Carl Holder
- Eriq La Salle as Deputy Bernie Miles
- Clifton James as Chief Ed Coffin
- Christopher Murney as Lenny Barron
- James Purcell as Rob Legler
- Louis Zorich as John Kragopoulos
- Devin Ratray as Neil Keeney
