= Taylor–Couette flow =

Measurement of viscosity in fluid dynamics

Setup of a Taylor–Couette system

In fluid dynamics, the Taylor–Couette flow consists of a viscous fluid confined in the gap between two rotating cylinders. For low angular velocities, measured by the Reynolds number Re, the flow is steady and purely azimuthal. This basic state is known as circular Couette flow, after Maurice Marie Alfred Couette, who used this experimental device as a means to measure viscosity. Sir Geoffrey Ingram Taylor investigated the stability of Couette flow in a ground-breaking paper. Taylor's paper became a cornerstone in the development of hydrodynamic stability theory and demonstrated that the no-slip condition, which was in dispute by the scientific community at the time, was the correct boundary condition for viscous flows at a solid boundary.

Taylor showed that when the angular velocity of the inner cylinder is increased above a certain threshold, Couette flow becomes unstable and a secondary steady state characterized by axisymmetric toroidal vortices, known as Taylor vortex flow, emerges. Subsequently, upon increasing the angular speed of the cylinder the system undergoes a progression of instabilities which lead to states with greater spatio-temporal complexity, with the next state being called wavy vortex flow. If the two cylinders rotate in opposite sense then spiral vortex flow arises. Beyond a certain Reynolds number there is the onset of turbulence.

Circular Couette flow has wide applications ranging from desalination to magnetohydrodynamics and also in viscosimetric analysis. Different flow regimes have been categorized over the years including twisted Taylor vortices and wavy outflow boundaries. It has been a well researched and documented flow in fluid dynamics.

== Flow description ==
A simple Taylor–Couette flow is a steady flow created between two rotating infinitely long coaxial cylinders. Since the cylinder lengths are infinitely long, the flow is essentially unidirectional in steady state. If the inner cylinder with radius $R_1$ is rotating at constant angular velocity $\Omega_1$ and the outer cylinder with radius $R_2$ is rotating at constant angular velocity $\Omega_2$ as shown in figure, then the azimuthal velocity component is given by

$$v_\theta= Ar + \frac{B}{r}, \quad A = \Omega_1 \frac{\mu-\eta^2}{1-\eta^2}, \quad B = \Omega_1 R_1^2 \frac{1-\mu}{1-\eta^2}$$

where

$$\mu = \frac{\Omega_2}{\Omega_1}, \quad \eta=\frac{R_1}{R_2}.$$

== Rayleigh's criterion ==
Lord Rayleigh studied the stability of the problem with inviscid assumption i.e., perturbing Euler equations. The criterion states that in the absence of viscosity the necessary and sufficient condition for distribution of azimuthal velocity $v_\theta(r)$ to be stable is

$$\Phi\equiv \frac{1}{r^3}\frac{d}{dr}(rv_\theta)^2\geq 0$$

everywhere in the interval; and, further, that the distribution is unstable if $(rv_\theta)^2$ should decrease anywhere in the interval. Since $|rv_\theta|$ represents angular momentum per unit mass, of a fluid element about the axis of rotation, an alternative way of stating the criterion is: a stratification of angular momentum about an axis is stable if and if only it increases monotonically outward.

Applying this criterion to the Taylor-Couette flow indicates that the flow is stable if $\mu >\eta^2$, i.e., for stability, the outer cylinder must rotate (in the same sense) with an angular speed greater than $\eta^2$-times that of the inner cylinder. The Rayleigh's criterion is violated ($\Phi<0$) throughout the whole fluid when $0<\mu<\eta^2$. On the other hand, when the cylinders rotate in opposite directions, i.e., when $\mu<0$, Rayleigh's criterion is violated only in the inner region, i.e., $\Phi(r)<0$ for $\eta<r/R_2<\eta_0$ where $\eta_0 = \eta [(1+|\mu|)/(\eta^2+|\mu|)]^{1/2}$.

== Taylor's criterion ==
In a seminal work, G. I. Taylor found the criterion for instability in the presence of viscous forces both experimentally and theoretically. In general, viscous forces are found to postpone the onset of instability, predicted by Rayleigh's criterion. The stability is characterized by three parameters, namely, $\eta$, $\mu$ and a Taylor number

$$\mathrm{Ta} = \frac{4\Omega_1^2 R_1^4}{\nu^2} \frac{(1-\mu)(1-\mu/\eta^2)}{(1-\eta^2)^2}.$$

The first result pertains to the fact that the flow is stable for $\mu>\eta^2$, consistent with Rayleigh's criterion. However, there are also stable cases in certain parametric range for $\mu<\eta^2$.

Taylor obtained explicit criterion for the narrow gap in which the annular gap $R_2-R_1$ is small compared with the mean radius $(R_1+R_2)/2$, or in other words, $1-\eta \ll (1+\eta)/2\approx 1$. A better definition of Taylor number in the thin-gap approximation is

$$\mathrm{Ta} = - \frac{2A\Omega_1R_2^4}{\nu^2}(1-\eta)^4(1+\mu).$$

In terms of this Taylor number, the critical condition for same-sense rotation was found to be

$$\mathrm{Ta}_c=1708, \quad 0\leq\mu\leq 1.$$

As $\mu\rightarrow 1$, the critical Taylor number is given by

$$\mathrm{Ta}_c=1707.76 \left[1-0.00761 \left(\frac{1-\mu}{1+\mu}\right)^2\right].$$

== Taylor vortex ==
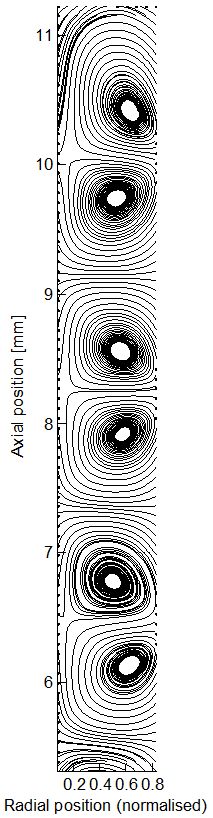
Streamlines showing Taylor–Couette vortices in the radial-vertical plane, at Re = 950

Taylor vortices (also named after Sir Geoffrey Ingram Taylor) are vortices formed in rotating Taylor–Couette flow when the Taylor number ($\mathrm{Ta}$) of the flow exceeds a critical value $\mathrm{Ta_c}$.

For flow in which

$$\mathrm{Ta}<\mathrm{Ta_c},$$

instabilities in the flow are not present, i.e. perturbations to the flow are damped out by viscous forces, and the flow is steady. But, as the $\mathrm{Ta}$ exceeds $\mathrm{Ta_c}$, axisymmetric instabilities appear. The nature of these instabilities is that of an exchange of stabilities (rather than an overstability), and the result is not turbulence but rather a stable secondary flow pattern that emerges in which large toroidal vortices form in flow, stacked one on top of the other. These are the Taylor vortices. While the fluid mechanics of the original flow are unsteady when $\mathrm{Ta}>\mathrm{Ta_c}$, the new flow, called Taylor–Couette flow, with the Taylor vortices present, is actually steady until the flow reaches a large Reynolds number, at which point the flow transitions to unsteady "wavy vortex" flow, presumably indicating the presence of non-axisymmetric instabilities.

The idealized mathematical problem is posed by choosing a particular value of $\mu$, $\eta$, and $\mathrm{Ta}$. As $\eta \rightarrow 1$ and $\mu \rightarrow 0$ from below, the critical Taylor number is $\mathrm{Ta_c} \simeq 1708$

== Gollub–Swinney circular Couette experiment ==
In 1975, J. P. Gollub and H. L. Swinney published a paper on the onset of turbulence in rotating fluid. In a Taylor–Couette flow system, they observed that, as the rotation rate increases, the fluid stratifies into a pile of "fluid donuts". With further increases in the rotation rate, the donuts oscillate and twist and finally become turbulent. Their study helped establish the Ruelle–Takens scenario in turbulence, which is an important contribution by Floris Takens and David Ruelle towards understanding how hydrodynamic systems transition from stable flow patterns into turbulent. While the principal, governing factor for this transition is the Reynolds number, there are other important influencing factors: whether the flow is open (meaning there is a lateral up- and downstream) or closed (flow is laterally bound; e.g. rotating), and bounded (influenced by wall effects) or unbounded (not influenced by wall effects). According to this classification the Taylor–Couette flow is an example of a flow pattern forming in a closed, bounded flow system.
