= Cole–Hopf transformation =

Partial differential equation

The Cole–Hopf transformation, developed independently by Julian D. Cole and Eberhard Hopf in 1950, is a change of variables that allows to transform a special kind of parabolic partial differential equations (PDEs) with a quadratic nonlinearity into a linear heat equation. In particular, it provides an explicit formula for fairly general solutions of the PDE in terms of the initial datum and the heat kernel.

Consider the following PDE:

$$u_{t} - a\Delta u + b\|\nabla u\|^{2} = 0, \quad u(0,x) = g(x)$$

where $x\in \mathbb{R}^{n}$, $a,b$ are constants, $\Delta$ is the Laplace operator, $\nabla$ is the gradient, and $\|\cdot\|$ is the Euclidean norm in $\mathbb{R}^{n}$. By assuming that $w = \phi(u)$, where $\phi(\cdot)$ is an unknown smooth function, we may calculate:

$$w_{t} = \phi'(u)u_{t}, \quad \Delta w = \phi'(u)\Delta u + \phi''(u)\|\nabla u\|^{2}$$

Which implies that:

$$\begin{aligned}
w_{t} = \phi'(u)u_{t} &= \phi'(u)\left( a\Delta u - b\|\nabla u\|^{2}\right) \\
&= a\Delta w - (a\phi'' + b\phi')\|\nabla u\|^{2} \\
&= a\Delta w
\end{aligned}$$

if we constrain $\phi$ to satisfy $a\phi'' + b\phi' = 0$. Then we may transform the original nonlinear PDE into the canonical heat equation by using the transformation:

$w(u) = e^{-bu/a}$

This is the Cole-Hopf transformation. With the transformation, the following initial-value problem can now be solved:

$$w_{t} - a\Delta w = 0, \quad w(0,x) = e^{-bg(x)/a}$$

The unique, bounded solution of this system is:

$$w(t,x) = {1\over{(4\pi at)^{n/2}}} \int_{\mathbb{R}^{n}} e^{-\|x-y\|^{2}/4at - bg(y)/a}dy$$

Since the Cole–Hopf transformation implies that $u = -(a/b)\log w$, the solution of the original nonlinear PDE is:

$$u(t,x) = -{a\over{b}}\log \left[ {1\over{(4\pi at)^{n/2}}} \int_{\mathbb{R}^{n}} e^{-\|x-y\|^{2}/4at - bg(y)/a}dy \right]$$

The complex form of the Cole–Hopf transformation can be used to transform the Schrödinger equation to the Madelung equation.

== Applications ==
- Aerodynamics
- Stochastic optimal control
- Solving the viscous Burgers' equation
- Madelung equation
