= The Man Who Wasn't There (1983 film) =

- Theatrical release poster
- Directed by: Bruce Malmuth
- Written by: Stanford Sherman
- Produced by: Frank Mancuso, Jr.
- Starring: Steve Guttenberg; Jeffrey Tambor; Art Hindle
- Cinematography: Frederick Moore
- Edited by: Harry Keller
- Music by: Miles Goodman
- Distributed by: Paramount Pictures
- Release date: August 12, 1983
- Running time: 111 minutes
- Country: United States
- Language: English
- Budget: $6.5 million
- Box office: $2,443,487

The Man Who Wasn't There is a 1983 American 3-D comedy film directed by Bruce Malmuth and starring Steve Guttenberg.

== Plot ==
When he accidentally takes possession of a top-secret invisibility potion while en route to his wedding, government bureaucrat Sam Cooper finds himself engulfed in a madcap free-for-all as Russians and other bad guys try to get the substance. To elude the Reds, his own State Department bosses and his livid fiancée, Cooper takes the vanishing juice himself—which only makes matters worse.

== Cast ==
- Steve Guttenberg as Sam Cooper
- Jeffrey Tambor as Boris Potemkin
- Art Hindle as Ted Durand
- Morgan Hart as Amanda
- Lisa Langlois as Cindy Worth
- William Forsythe as "Pug Face" Crusher
- Bruce Malmuth as "Fireplug" Crusher
- Ron Canada as Barker
- Michael Ensign as Assistant Secretary
- Richard Paul as Pudgy Aide
- Miguel Ferrer as A Waiter
- Brinke Stevens as Nymphette

== Production ==
The project began when Paramount executives were inspired by the success Friday the 13th Part III and commissioned Friday series producer Frank Mancuso Jr. to produce another 3D film. Despite not even having a script or team ready for such a project, Paramount announced an untitled 3-D film for Summer of 1983 with the production thrown together very quickly. The concept was to remake something from the Paramount film library, or some widely known subject, and add in 3-D effects. Following rejected pitches that included a 3-D remake of Rosemary's Baby, Mancuso ultimately decided to do a mixture of Foul Play and North by Northwest with added invisibility elements.

== Critical reception ==
Movie historian Leonard Maltin declared the picture a "BOMB" (his lowest possible rating) and opined that "...Better writing, directing, and acting can be found at your average nursery-school pageant."

== Home media ==
A Blu-ray 3D version of the film was released by Kino Lorber in December 2023. The 3-D restoration was completed by the 3D Film Archive.
