= Rollover (film) =

1981 American thriller film directed by Alan J. Pakula

- Theatrical release poster
- Directed by: Alan J. Pakula
- Screenplay by: David Shaber
- Story by: David Shaber; Howard Kohn; David Weir
- Produced by: Bruce Gilbert
- Starring: Jane Fonda; Kris Kristofferson; Hume Cronyn
- Cinematography: William Garroni; Giuseppe Rotunno
- Edited by: Evan A. Lottman
- Music by: Michael Small
- Color process: Technicolor
- Production company: Orion Pictures
- Distributed by: Warner Bros.
- Release date: December 11, 1981
- Running time: 118 minutes
- Country: United States
- Language: English
- Budget: $16 million
- Box office: $10,851,261

Rollover is a 1981 American political thriller drama film directed by Alan J. Pakula and starring Jane Fonda and Kris Kristofferson. The film was nominated for a Razzie Award for Worst Actor for Kristofferson at the 2nd Golden Raspberry Awards.

== Plot ==
Lee Winters is the widow of Charlie, the chairman and primary stockholder of Winterchem Enterprises, a chemical company, who is attempting to obtain financing of the purchase of a processing plant in Spain while trying to determine why her husband was murdered. Apparently, the late Charlie discovered some damning information about an Account Number 21214, a secret slush fund involving asset transfers.

Respected financier Hubbell Smith takes over as president of Borough National Bank at the request of First New York Bank chairman Maxwell Emery, in an attempt to have Smith discover the financial status of Borough National.

Smith discovers that the bank isn't just in trouble, it's essentially so insolvent that it can't even pay its next dividend. It needs to find a customer who needs to borrow a lot of money and either loan the money or act as broker in the deal in order to raise some quick cash and stave off intervention by the Federal Reserve.

One of the largest customers of Borough National is Winterchem, but because of federal lending limits, the bank "can't loan them a dime" but conceivably could be involved in brokering a deal between Winterchem and some other lender capable of loaning the approximately $500 million needed to buy the plant, and the bank would receive a 1% finder's fee for making the arrangement. Later there are tense moments when Borough National are waiting for Arab oil money deposits to be renewed in a "roll over". The bank would be unable to refund the deposits, but at the last minute the roll over occurs, except for some money diverted to account 21214.

Smith becomes involved, both financially and romantically, with Winters in her attempts to finance the purchase of the petrochemical plant and in the discovery of the mystery of account 21214. They finally do so by brokering a deal with some Arab investors who take control of her stock as security for the transaction.

Smith later discovers that account 21214 is actually a slush fund where Emery is moving money belonging to the Arabs into gold as a safe haven against potential losses if the dollar collapses. The Arabs are extremely worried that if anyone finds out, their assets will vanish in a public panic as American currency becomes worthless.

Winters also discovers the Arabs are behind account 21214, and wants her stock back in exchange for her silence; she has overheard part of Smith's conversation with Emery and mistakenly believes he was double-crossing her. A fake limo driver who is actually working for the Arab investors tries to kidnap her with the intent of killing her—as it turns out they did to her husband—to prevent her from disclosing what she knows, and when the attempt on her life fails, the Arabs panic and pull all of their money out of every bank in the United States, and possibly the entire world.

The globe is gripped by panic and rioting as people discover all of their money is now worthless. Emery is shown in his office - dead, an apparent suicide. The economic crisis paralyzes the world, but by spilling over boundaries between east and west blocs, and between developing and industrialized nations, it also unites the world in common cause. In the penultimate scene, workers at Borough National stand idle while listening to a report of the growing economic crisis. As the camera pans across the trading floor of the bank, the viewer sees that it's now empty of workers, the lights off, the desks and machines covered - completely inactive. Only Smith remains. Winters joins him in the final scene. Smith tells her that he's looking for a way to start anew. Winters offers to become his partner.

== Cast ==
- Jane Fonda as Lee Winters
- Kris Kristofferson as Hub Smith
- Hume Cronyn as Maxwell Emery
- Josef Sommer as Roy Lefcourt
- Bob Gunton as Sal Naftari
- Macon McCalman as Jerry Fewster
- Jodi Long as Betsy Okamoto
- Martha Plimpton as Fewster's Older Daughter
- Norman Snow as Hishan
- Paul Hecht as Khalid
- George Page as Himself

== Themes and Analysis ==
Rollover explores the geopolitical and economic vulnerabilities of the petrodollar system, a framework established in 1974 wherein global oil exports are priced in U.S. dollars, compelling foreign nations to recycle those dollars into U.S. Treasury bonds and American financial institutions. The film's central conflict hinges on the threat of Arab investors abruptly liquidating their dollar holdings, triggering a catastrophic collapse of the American banking system.

Released in the aftermath of the 1973 oil crisis and the 1979 energy crisis, the film reflected contemporary anxieties regarding American dependency on foreign oil and the fragility of globalized capital. While critics at the time found the premise melodramatic, modern analysts and economists have noted the film's prescience in depicting systemic financial contagion and the weaponization of currency. The scenario of a broken "dollar loop"—whereby the withdrawal of foreign capital leads to soaring interest rates and hyperinflation—has been cited in contemporary geopolitical simulations and economic modeling of Middle Eastern conflicts. Retrospective reviews have highlighted the film's accurate portrayal of institutional corruption, with some noting that its depiction of premeditated bank failure foreshadowed the 2007–2008 financial crisis.

== Modern Relevance ==
Although critics in 1981 found the film's premise implausible and its financial jargon impenetrable, subsequent financial crises have prompted re-evaluation of its themes. Writing during the 2007–2008 financial crisis, Kim Newman observed in a Rotten Tomatoes editorial that the film's depiction of a Wall Street panic triggering "the collapse of the dollar and other international currencies, a complete loss of confidence in financial institutions and a global economic crisis" had become "eerily prophetic," noting that Rollover "had its sights set too far ahead—a quarter of a century on, it's more pertinent than Wall Street, and probably ought to have been required viewing at treasuries around the world." The film's specific reference to "Fanny Mae"—the Federal National Mortgage Association—has been cited as particularly prescient given the role of Fannie Mae in the subprime mortgage crisis. The scenario of a broken "dollar loop," whereby the sudden withdrawal of foreign capital leads to soaring interest rates, hyperinflation, and systemic banking failure, has continued to feature in contemporary geopolitical and economic simulations modeling the cascading effects of Middle Eastern conflicts and the potential decoupling of global oil markets from the U.S. dollar. A 2025 retrospective by Film Authority described the film as a "remarkably prescient if dramatically deficient financial drama" and an "interesting museum piece" that "describes a potential future scenario which has now come to pass several times over."

== Reception ==
The film opened the same weekend as Buddy Buddy and finished at number one with a gross of $2,260,889 and eventually gross $10,851,261 in the United States and Canada. The movie was a box-office bomb as it lost money on its budget of $16 million.

The film holds a 73% score on Rotten Tomatoes based on 11 reviews. Janet Maslin of The New York Times called the film one "so badly bungled that it can't help but rivet the audience's attention" while citing its ineffective casting and direction.
