= Daniel Riordan =

American actor

- Occupation: Actor
- Years active: 1984–present

Daniel Riordan is an American actor, known for providing the voice of Alduin, the main antagonist of The Elder Scrolls V: Skyrim.

== Filmography ==
=== Film ===
Year	Title	Role	Notes
1984	Breakin' 2: Electric Boogaloo	Surveyor	
1994	Pentathlon	Rhinehardt	
1994	Ed Wood	Pilot, Strapping Young Man	
1995	Pocahontas		video reference cast
1995	The Adventures of Captain Zoom in Outer Space	Ty Farrell/Captain Zoom	Television film
1996	Jingle All the Way	Turbo Man	
2004	The Pavilion	Northmour	
2006	Dreamgirls	L.A. Deejay	
2007	Dance Man	Narrator	Television film
2008	The Tale of Despereaux	The Mayor	Voice, uncredited
2009	Scooby-Doo! The Mystery Begins	Dark Specter	Voice, television film Credited as Dan Riordan
2014	Authors Anonymous	Richard Brodwell	

=== Television ===
Year	Title	Role	Notes
1986	The Magical World of Disney	Harry	Episode: "The B.R.A.T. Patrol"
1988	Mr. Belvedere	Stanley	Episode: "FoxTrot"
1988	Star Trek: The Next Generation	Rondon	Episode: "Coming of Age"
1988	The Munsters Today	Headlock Henderson	Episode: "Flyweight Champion of the World"
1989	Out of This World	Hewey	Episode: "Star Dog"
1989	Dragnet	Joe Simpson	Episode: "The Plumber"
1991	The Fanelli Boys	Tony LaCroix	Episode: "Accidents Will Happen"
1991	The New Adam-12	Nowiki Brother	Episode: "Homeless in America"
1993	Star Trek: Deep Space Nine	First Guard	Episode: "Progress"
1993	Sisters	Mover #2	Episode: "Out of the Ashes"
1993	Silk Stalkings	Gilbert Langley	Episode: "The Party's Over"
1994	Renegade	Rex Walker	Episode: "Charlie"
1996	The Fresh Prince of Bel-Air	Stan	Episode: "Boxing Helena"
1996	Weird Science	Cyborg Sam	Episode: "Cyborg Sam I Am"
1997	Conan	Narrator	
1997	Team Knight Rider	Judd / Reid Northmoor	Episode: "Choctaw L-9"
1998	Diagnosis: Murder	Doctor Gregory Othon	Episode: "Blood Will Out"
2000	Transformers: Robots in Disguise	Megatron/Galvatron, Omega Prime	Voice, 39 episodes
2003	The Wild Thornberrys	Master of Ceremonies	Voice, episode: "Look Who's Squawking"
2003	Star Trek: Enterprise	Duras	2 Episodes
2005	Carnivàle	Younger Thug	Episode: "Cheyenne, WY"
2005	Monk	Bartender	Episode: "Mr. Monk and Little Monk"
2007	Avatar: The Last Airbender	General Mung	Voice, episode: "The Painted Lady"
2010	Tim and Eric Awesome Show, Great Job!		Episode: "Greene Machine"
2010	Zeke and Luther	Dr. Blitz	Episode: "Robo-Luth"
2011	Parenthood	Houseboat Neighbor	Episode: "Qualities and Difficulties"
2014	Good Luck Charlie	Principal Higgins	Episode: "Accepted"
2014	Kirby Buckets	Mr. Reardon	Episode: "Kirby Almighty"
2014	Match	Big Guy	Episode: "Seer"
2015	Childrens Hospital	Russian General	Episode: "Codename: Jennifer"
2016	New Girl	Alan Todd / News Anchor	2 episodes
2016	Documentary Now!		Episode: "Mr. Runner Up: My Life as an Oscar Bridesmaid, Part 2"
2021	Hello Carbot	Luckypunch	Episode: "Legendary Giant Statue"

=== Video games ===
Year	Title	Role	Notes
1998	Heretic II	Corvus, the Celestial Watcher, Morcalavin	Credited as Daniel Riordian
2000	Crimson Skies	Nathan Zachary	Uncredited
2002	Age of Mythology	Arkantos, Kastor	
2003	Armed & Dangerous	Brother Zoltof	Credited as Dan Riordan
2004	Forgotten Realms: Demon Stone	Rannek	
2004	EverQuest II	Male Merchants	
2005	Shadow of Rome	Decius Brutus, Vipsanius	
2005	The Incredible Hulk: Ultimate Destruction	Doc Samson	
2005	X-Men Legends II: Rise of Apocalypse	Mister Sinister, Stryfe	
2005	Age of Empires III	Pierre Beaumont, George Washington	
2006	24: The Game	Additional USA VO	
2006	Hitman: Blood Money	Mark Parchezzi III	
2006	Justice League Heroes	Martian Manhunter	
2007	300: March to Glory	Xerxes, Hydarnes	Credited as Daniel Reardon
2007	Transformers: The Game	Bonecrusher, Shockwave, Decepticon Drones	
2008	Avatar: The Last Airbender – Into the Inferno	General Mung	
2010	White Knight Chronicles: International Edition	Dragias	
2011	League of Legends	Yorick	
2011	The Elder Scrolls V: Skyrim	Alduin, Hircine	
2012	Mass Effect 3	Primarch Adrien Victus, Additional Voices	
2012	Prototype 2	Col. Douglas Rooks	
2013	Lightning Returns: Final Fantasy XIII	Bhunivelze	
2014	Diablo III: Reaper of Souls	Additional Voices	
2014	The Evil Within	Marcelo Jimenez	
2014	Call of Duty: Advanced Warfare	Additional Voices	
2015	Evolve	Cabot	
2015	The Order: 1886	Mysterious Figure	
2015	Rise of the Tomb Raider	Additional voices	
2017	Dishonored: Death of the Outsider	Aristocrats	
2018	Spider-Man	Detective Mackey	
2019	Days Gone	Colonel Matthew Garret	
2020	Desperados III	Frank	
2020	Age of Empires III: Definitive Edition	George Washington	
2022	Triangle Strategy	Regna Glenbrook	

Preceded by David Kaye; 1998; Beast Wars	Voice of Megatron/Galvatron; 2000-2001; Robots in Disguise	Succeeded by David Kaye; 2002-2006; Unicron Trilogy
