= Peter Jurasik =

American actor (born 1950)

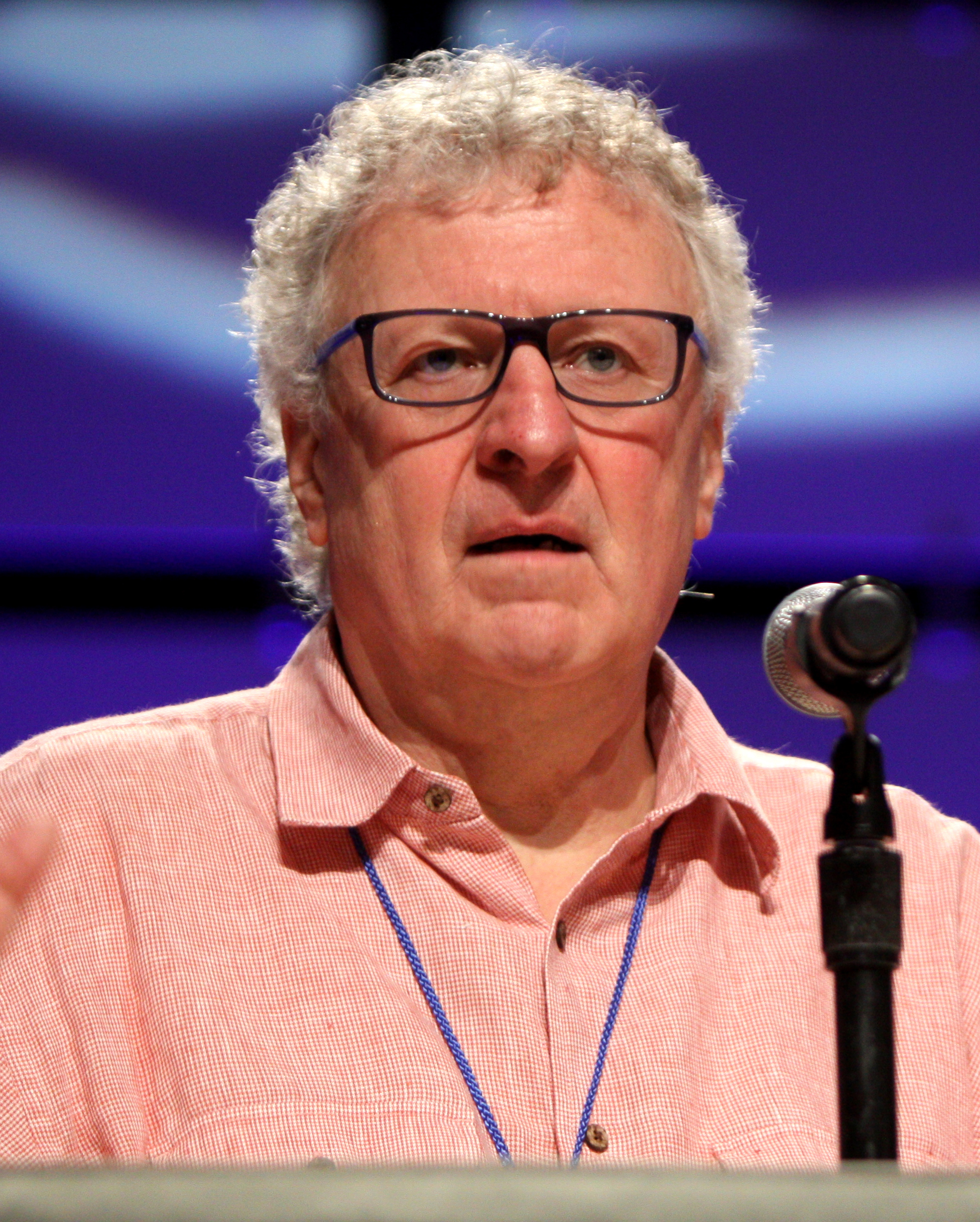
- Peter Jurasik in 2013
- Born: April 25, 1950 (age 76); Queens, New York, U.S.
- Occupation: Actor
- Years active: 1977–present
- Website: peterjurasik.com

Peter Jurasik (/ˈdʒʊərəsɪk/ JOOR-ə-sik; born April 25, 1950) is an American actor known for his television roles as Londo Mollari in the 1990s science fiction series Babylon 5 and Sid the Snitch on the 1980s series Hill Street Blues and its short-lived spinoff Beverly Hills Buntz. Peter Jurasik also portrayed Oberon Geiger, Diana's boss, in the T.V. series Sliders.

== Personal life ==
Jurasik was born in Queens, New York. He is the third of four children. He attended the University of New Hampshire, where he appeared in several plays. He lives with his wife and son in Wilmington, North Carolina, and teaches acting for the camera in the Theatre Department and the Film Studies Department at the University of North Carolina at Wilmington.

== Career ==
=== Acting ===
Jurasik is best known for playing Londo Mollari on Babylon 5. He has guest-starred as an ornithologist in one episode of MacGyver, suspect Dave Lorinz in one episode of NYPD Blue, CID investigator Captain Triplett in two episodes of M*A*S*H, and Dr. Oberon Geiger on three episodes of Sliders. Jurasik starred as Mitch Kline in the short-lived 1983 CBS series Bay City Blues and as Dr. Simon Ward in an episode of Columbo: "Sex and the Married Detective" in 1989. He also had a long-running occasional role on Hill Street Blues as "Sid the Snitch" which became semi-regular in the last two seasons. At the conclusion of that series, his and co-star Dennis Franz's characters were spun off into the short-lived series Beverly Hills Buntz. In 1985, Jurasik co-starred with Michael Keaton and Clint Howard in the Keaton-produced short film "But I'm Happy" which aired on NBC as part of David Letterman's 'Holiday Film Festival'. His film roles include Crom in the film Tron (1982), with future Babylon 5 co-star Bruce Boxleitner, and as Roy, the perfect father neighbor, in Problem Child (1990). In 2000, Jurasik appeared in the Doctor Who audio adventure Winter for the Adept.

=== Writing ===
In 1998, he wrote Diplomatic Act (ISBN 0-671-87788-7) with William H. Keith Jr., a science fiction novel wherein the lead character, an actor in a science fiction show, is kidnapped by aliens who think he is the character from the program. The book is similar in tone and story to Galaxy Quest, which was released one year later.

== Filmography ==
Film
Year	Film	Role	Other notes
1978	Born Again	Henry Kissinger	
1982	Tron	Crom	
1988	Night Club	Pete	
1990	Problem Child	Roy	
1993	Mr. Jones	Dr. Rosen	
1994	Angel 4: Undercover	Kevin	
1999	Baby Huey's Great Easter Adventure	Tiger's Manager	
2001	Breathing Hard	Interviewer	
2003	Runaway Jury	Professor Phelan	
2004	Stateside	Hector Pelusso	
2004	Grady's 80s	Professor Strickland	Short
2005	The Writer's Pub	Clothes Store Proprietor	Short
2010	Two Hours in the Dark	Dr. Stanley Imerman	Short
2010	Quantum Apocalypse	President Scott	Movie
2011	Superhero	Principal Steinberg	Short
2012	Arthur and Mike	Bus Driver	Short
2012	Little Red Wagon	Warren	
2013	42 (film)	Hotel Manager	
2015	The Longest Ride	Howie Sanders	
2015	Time's Like Dying	Bank Manager (voice)	Short
2015	Step-A-Head	Cummings	Short
2016	The Red Cape	Hugh MacRae	Short
2023	Babylon 5: The Road Home	Ambassador Londo Mollari	Voice; Direct-to-Video
Television
Year	Title	Role	Notes
1978–79	Barney Miller	George Alsop / Philip Hamel	Inquisition / The Bank
1979	Paris	Brian Duff	Episode: "Burnout"
1980	The White Shadow	Film Producer	Episode: "Coolidge Goes Hollywood"
1981	M*A*S*H	Captain Triplett	Snap Judgement
1982	Report to Murphy	Culley	Episode: "The Girl Most Likely"
1982	In the Custody of Strangers	Andy Barnes	TV movie
1982	In Security	Henry	TV movie
1982	Taxi	Tom Pelton	Zena's Honeymoon
1982	Family Ties	Max Brown	A Christmas Story
1982–87	Hill Street Blues	Sid the Snitch (Sid Thurston)	25 episodes
1983	Bay City Blues	Mitch Klein	8 episodes
1983	Fame	Brother Timothy	Ending on a High Note
1984	Night Court	Leonard Brandon	Welcome Back, Momma (Night Court)
1985	Scandal Sheet	Simon McKey	TV movie
1985	MacGyver	Dr. Charles Alden	Episode: "Trumbo's World"
1986	Acceptable Risks	Jack Morris	TV movie
1986	Scarecrow and Mrs. King	Dr. Will Towne/Popovich	Episode: "Wrong Number"
1987-1988	Beverly Hills Buntz	Sid Thurston	13 episodes
1989	Full Exposure: The Sex Tapes Scandal	Portis	TV movie
1989	Columbo	Dr. Simon Ward	Episode: "Sex and the Married Detective"
1989	Peter Gunn	Lt. Jacoby	TV movie
1989	Midnight Caller	Walter Wheaton	1 episode
1989	Amen	Charlie Murdock	Episode: "Witness for the Defense"
1989	Dear John	Brad	8 episodes
1990	Crash: The Mystery of Flight 1501	Bob Stanton	TV movie
1989	Perry Mason: The Case of the Ruthless Reporter	Gary Slate	TV movie
1989	Father Dowling Mysteries	Tim Shannon	Episode: "The Missing Witness Mystery"
1991	Growing Pains	Douglas Stanton	Paper Tigers; The Big Fix
1991	Civil Wars	Sherman Stipes	Episode: "Daveju-Vu All Over Again"
1992	Calendar Girl, Cop Killer? The Bambi Bembenek Story		TV movie
1992	A House of Secrets and Lies	Steve	TV movie
1993	Love, Honor & Obey: The Last Mafia Marriage	Father Rosetti	TV miniseries
1993	Matlock	Steve Fisher	Episode: "The Singer"
1993–98	Babylon 5	Ambassador Londo Mollari	Main cast, all episodes
1996	The Late Shift (film)	Howard Stringer	TV movie
1998–1999	3rd Rock from the Sun	Principal Greschner	2 episodes
1999–2000	Sliders	Doctor Oberon Geiger	3 episodes
2000	NYPD Blue	Dave Lorinz	Episode: "Little Abner"
2000	Dawson's Creek	Walter Kubelik	Episode: "Burnout"
2008	One Tree Hill	Carl	Episode: "Between Order and Randomness"
2017	Mercy Street	Judah P. Benjamin	Episode: "Southern Mercy"
