= Erdogan–Chatwin equation =

Fluid dynamics equation

In fluid dynamics, Erdogan–Chatwin equation is a nonlinear diffusion equation for the scalar field, that accounts for shear-induced dispersion due to horizontal buoyancy forces. The equation was named after M. Emin Erdogan and Phillip C. Chatwin, who derived the equation in 1967. The equation for the scalar field $c(x,t)$ reads

$$\frac{\partial c}{\partial t} = \frac{\partial}{\partial x}\left\{D\left[1 + \frac{\gamma g^2 h^8 \alpha^2}{\nu^2 D^2}\left(\frac{\partial c}{\partial x}\right)^2\right]\frac{\partial c}{\partial x}\right\},$$

where

$D$	is the diffusion coefficient for the scalar $c$;
$\gamma$	is a numerical factor, which in planar problems assumes the value $2/2835$;
$g$	is the gravitational acceleration;
$2h$	is the width of the fluid layer in which dispersion is occurring;
$\alpha$	is the volumetric expansion coefficient defined by $\alpha=-\rho^{-1}\partial\rho/\partial c$ with $\rho$ being the fluid density;
$\nu$	is the kinematic viscosity of the fluid.

Suppose $L$ is the characteristic length scale for $c$, then the characteristic time scale is given by $L^2/D$. And suppose $C$ is a characteristic value for $c$. Then, we introudce the non-dimensional variables

$$\tau = \frac{t}{L^2/D}, \quad \xi=\frac{x}{L}, \quad \varphi =\frac{c}{C}$$

then the Erdogan–Chatwin equation becomes

$$\frac{\partial \varphi}{\partial \tau} = \frac{\partial}{\partial \xi}\left\{\left[1 + \gamma Ra^2\left(\frac{\partial \varphi}{\partial \xi}\right)^2\right]\frac{\partial \varphi}{\partial \xi}\right\},$$

where $Ra=gh^4\alpha C/\nu D$ is a Rayleigh number. For $Ra\ll 1$, the equation reduces to the linear heat equation, $\varphi_\tau = \varphi_{\xi\xi}$ and for $Ra\gg 1$, the equation reduces to $\varphi_\tau = 3\gamma Ra^2\varphi_\xi^2\varphi_{\xi\xi}$.

== See also ==
- Ostroumov flow
