= Julian Cole =

American mathematician (1925–1999)

- Born: Julian David Cole; April 2, 1925; Brooklyn, New York, U.S.
- Died: April 17, 1999 (aged 74); Albany, New York, U.S.
- Education: Cornell University; Caltech
- Scientific career
- Fields: Mathematician
- Workplaces: Caltech; UCLA; RPI
- Doctoral advisor: Paco Lagerstrom
- Doctoral students: Norman Malmuth

Julian David Cole (April 2, 1925 – April 17, 1999) was an American mathematician. He is known for his groundbreaking work in mathematical applications to aerodynamics and transonic flow, and in non-linear equations more generally. He graduated 36 PhD students and won many of the most significant scientific honors over his career, including simultaneous election to the National Academy of Sciences and National Academy of Engineering in 1976.

== Biography ==
Cole earned an undergraduate degree in engineering from Cornell, after which he entered Caltech as a graduate student. He worked with Hans Liepmann and Paco Lagerstrom, the latter his advisor, submitting a dissertation on transonic flow in 1949. Lagerstrom and Cole continued their work, having formed a small research group at GALCIT to better understand the mathematics of fluid flow. These two, along with Leon Trilling found that flows having weak shocks could be described by Burgers' equation, for which Cole later found a clever transformation to solve it. Cole continued to delve deeper into this topic for the next decade.

Cole took sabbatical in 1963–1964 at Harvard, where he wrote a book on this body of work: Perturbation Methods in Applied Mathematics.

Cole is the namesake of the Society for Industrial and Applied Mathematics's Julian Cole Lectureship.

== Awards ==
- Fellow, American Academy of Arts and Sciences
- Fellow, American Institute of Aeronautics and Astronautics
- Fellow, American Physical Society
- National Academy of Engineering
- National Academy of Sciences
