= Renée Coleman =

Canadian actress (born 1962)

- Born: January 8, 1962 (age 64); Saskatoon, Saskatchewan, Canada
- Education: Pacifica Graduate Institute, Ph.D.
- Years active: 1987–1995
- Spouse: Albert Erdynast
- Website: www.ReneeColeman.net

Renée Coleman (born January 8, 1962) is a Canadian actress who has appeared in several TV shows and movies.

== Acting ==
She is best known for her role in the NBC TV series Quantum Leap, in which she played the role of Alia, the "evil leaper." She was the star of the Diagnosis: Murder episode "Call Me Incontestable," where she played a member of a dating service who was under suspicion for murder.

Coleman is also known for her role in the 1992 film A League of Their Own as left-fielder and substitute catcher Alice Gaspers, and in Who's Harry Crumb?, as kidnapping-victim Jennifer Downing.

Coleman starred and appeared in films from the late 1980s through the mid-1990s, including After School as September (1988, one of her early starring roles), Pentathlon (one of her last domestic roles), the Mexican film El Jardín del Edén (1994), the Polish film Gracze (1995), and the Swiss film Waiting for Michelangelo (1995).

== Later career ==
In 1995, Coleman left the film business and returned to school, where she earned her Ph.D. in Mythological Studies (with an emphasis on Depth Psychology) at Pacifica Graduate Institute in 2002. Her dissertation focused on the myth of Persephone. She currently lives with her husband and their four children in Santa Clarita, California, where she works in a private practice as a dream analyzer. In August 2012, Coleman's first book, Icons of a Dreaming Heart – The Art and Practice of Dream-Centered Living, was published.

== Filmography ==
Film
Year	Title	Role	Notes
1987	Anna	Woman #4 / Woman in Bonnet	
1988	Rocket Gibraltar	Waitress	Credited as Renee Coleman
1988	After School	September Lane	
1988	Who's Harry Crumb?	Jennifer Downing	Credited as Renee Coleman
1992	A League of Their Own	Alice "Skeeter" Gaspers	Credited as Renee Coleman
1994	Pentathlon	Julia Davis	
1994	El jardín del Edén	Jane	
1995	Waiting for Michelangelo	Kelly Hildon	
1995	Gracze	Chris O'Callaghan	

Television
Year	Title	Role	Notes
1988	Crime Story	Pauli's Nurse	Season 2 episode 15: "Pauli Taglia's Dream"
1992-1993	Quantum Leap	Alia	3 episodes Credited as Reneé Coleman - 1 episode
1993	Matlock	Theresa Lavelle / Susie Baron	Credited as Renee Coleman; Season 7 episode 8: "The Fortune"
1993	Melrose Place	Celeste Campbell	Credited as Renee Coleman; Season 1 episode 26: "End Game"
1995	Diagnosis: Murder	Gloria	Credited as Renee Coleman; Season 2 episode 15: "Call Me Incontestable"
1995	The Watcher		Episode 10: "Reversal of Fortune: The Last Act/Lucky Charm/Handle with Care"
