= Fore Play =

1975 film by Bruce Malmuth, John G. Avildsen

- DVD cover
- Directed by: John G. Avildsen; Bruce Malmuth; Robert McCarty; Ralph Rosenblum
- Written by: Bruce Jay Friedman; Dan Greenburg; David Odell; Jack Richardson
- Produced by: Carl Gurevich; Benni Korzen
- Starring: Zero Mostel; Estelle Parsons; Jerry Orbach; George S. Irving; Pat Paulsen
- Cinematography: Ralf D. Bode; Adam Giffard; Jeff Lion Weinstock
- Edited by: Ron Kalish
- Music by: Gary William Friedman; Stan Vincent
- Distributed by: Troma Entertainment
- Release date: 1975
- Running time: 75 minutes
- Language: English

Fore Play is a 1975 comedy anthology film co-directed by Bruce Malmuth, Robert McCarty, Ralph Rosenblum, and future Academy Award-winner John G. Avildsen.

== Plot ==
Within a frame story in which a doctor, Professor Irwin Corey, talks about sex, the film is split into three segments: the first involves Norman Horner buying an animate sex doll and his many failed attempts to bed it. In the second story, Jerry Lorsey, a man suffering from writer's block, finds his muse by undressing various women. Finally, the third story involves the President of the United States, whose daughter Trixie is kidnapped and will be killed unless the president and his wife Gladys have sex on national television.

== Cast ==
- Zero Mostel as President/Don Pasquale
- Estelle Parsons as Gladys/Barmaid
- Pat Paulsen as Norman Horner
- Jerry Orbach as Jerry Lorsey
- George S. Irving as Reverend/Muse
- Carmen Álvarez Block as Anytime Annie Frasier
- Fred Baur as Secret Service/Mafia
- Irwin Corey as Professor Irwin Corey
- Thayer David as General
- Paul Dooley as Salesman
- Andrew Duncan as Frank Hurdlemeyer
- Laurie Heineman as Trixie
- Deborah Loomis as Waldo
- George King as Masseur
- Tom McDermott as Chief Justice McDonald
- Louisa Moritz as Sylvia Arliss
- Shelley Plimpton as First Girl

== Production ==
The film was originally made up of four segments (hence the title of the film), but the last segment was ultimately cut from the final draft of the script. The frame story, "Professor Corey on Sex", is a parody of a "white coater" sex education film and was written by Jack Richardson and directed by Ralph Rosenblum. The first segment, "Norman and the Polish Doll", was written by Dan Greenburg and directed by Robert McCarty. The second segment, "Vortex", is written by Jack Richardson and Bruce Jay Friedman and directed by Bruce Malmuth. The final segment, "Inaugural Ball", was written by David Odell and directed by John G. Avildsen.

== Release ==
The film is currently being distributed by Troma Entertainment.

== See also ==
- List of American films of 1975
