= Norman Malmuth =

American aeronautical engineer

- Born: Norman David Malmuth; January 22, 1931; Brooklyn, New York City
- Died: July 3, 2007 (aged 76); Newbury Park, California
- Education: University of Cincinnati; Polytechnic Institute of Brooklyn; California Institute of Technology
- Awards: Fellow of the American Physical Society and American Institute of Aeronautics and Astronautics
- Scientific career
- Fields: aeronautical engineering
- Workplaces: Grumman Aircraft; Rockwell International
- Doctoral advisor: Julian Cole

Norman David Malmuth (January 22, 1931 – July 3, 2007) was an American aeronautical engineer who made fundamental contributions to nonlinear gas dynamics.

== Biography ==
Malmuth was a native of Brooklyn, born on January 22, 1931. He was one of four children born to parents Jacob and Selma Malmuth. He had one sister, Gail, and two brothers, Bruce and Daniel. Norman Malmuth left New York to study aeronautical engineering at the University of Cincinnati, where he earned his bachelor's degree in 1953. After completing his undergraduate study, Malmuth worked for Grumman Aircraft for three years. He continued studying aeronautical engineering, and earned a master's degree in the subject in 1956, from the Polytechnic Institute of Brooklyn. Upon earning his master's degree, Malmuth began working for Rockwell International. Malmuth concurrently pursued doctoral study in the same field at the California Institute of Technology, where he was advised by Julian Cole and graduated in 1962. Malmuth lived in the Conejo Valley for three decades, and while affiliated with the Rockwell Science Center, was elected a fellow of the American Physical Society in 1999, "[f]or his fundamental contributions in nonlinear gasdynamics involving application of combined asymptotic and numerical methods to the understanding of transonic, hypersonic and plasma aerodynamics as well as industrial flows." Malmuth was also a fellow of the American Institute of Aeronautics and Astronautics, and the 1991 recipient of its Aerodynamics Award. He died on July 3, 2007, in Newbury Park, California.
