= Ostroumov flow =

Flow induced by horizontal density gradient

In fluid dynamics, the Ostroumov flow, also known as the Ostroumov–Birikh–Hansen–Rattray flow describes fluid motion driven by horizontal density gradients within horizontal channels, pipes, or open water bodies such as rivers and estuaries. The flow is named after Georgy Andreyevich Ostroumov (1952), R. V. Birikh (1966), Donald V. Hansen and Maurice Rattray Jr (1965). Unlike the Poiseuille flow or the Couette flow, the velocity profile in the Ostroumov flow is a cubic function of the coordinate normal to gravity.

== Planar channel ==
Consider a two-dimensional planar channel of width $2h$ and their walls located at $z=-h$ and $z=+h$. The gravity vector is given by $\mathbf{g}=-g\mathbf{e}_z$, where $g$ is the gravitational acceleration. Suppose that there exists a horizontal density gradient in the fluid, i.e., $\rho=\rho(x,y,t)$ with a characteristic length scale $l$. Such gradients can be induced by some scalar field such as temperature or solute concentration, present within the fluid. Whenever horizontal density gradients exists within a fluid, mechanical equilibrium is impossible and thus, fluid motion occurs. Furthermore, we work in the usual lubrication theory or Hele-Shaw flow limit

$$\epsilon\equiv \frac{h}{l}\ll 1, \quad \frac{\rho_rU_bh}{\mu_r}\frac{h}{l}\ll 1$$

where $U_b$ is the characteristic velocity scale associated with the flow induced by the buoyancy forces and $(\rho_r,\mu_{r})$ are the reference values of fluid density and viscosity. If $\Delta\rho$ represents a characteristic density difference then $U_b$ is given by

$$U_b=\frac{\Delta \rho g h^3}{\mu_{r} l}, \quad Gr = \frac{\rho_rU_bh}{\mu_r}=\frac{\rho_r\Delta\rho gh^4}{\mu_r^2 l}$$

where $Gr$ is a Grashof number.

In the lubrication limit ($\epsilon\to 0$ and $\epsilon Gr \to 0$) under consideration, the variable-density ($\rho=\rho(x,y,t)$), variable viscosity ($\mu=\mu(x,y,t)$) Navier–Stokes equations reduces to

$$\begin{align}
&\frac{\partial p}{\partial x} =  \mu \frac{\partial^2 v_x}{\partial z^2}, \quad \frac{\partial p}{\partial y} = \mu \frac{\partial^2 v_y}{\partial z^2}, \quad\frac{\partial p}{\partial z} = -g \rho,\\
&\frac{\partial}{\partial x}(\rho v_x) + \frac{\partial}{\partial y}(\rho v_y) + \rho\frac{\partial v_z}{\partial z} = 0.
\end{align}$$

From the integration of the $z$-momentum equation, we thus obtain

$$\frac{\partial p}{\partial x}=-g\frac{\partial \rho}{\partial x} z, \quad \frac{\partial p}{\partial y}=-g\frac{\partial \rho}{\partial y} z$$

which implies the horizontal pressure gradient varies linearly with $z$; compare this with a Poiseuille flow where the pressure gradient is independent of $z$. The solution for the horizontal velocity field is thus given by

$$v_x = \frac{g}{\mu} \frac{\partial \rho}{\partial x} z (h^2-z^2), \quad v_y = \frac{g}{\mu} \frac{\partial \rho}{\partial y} z (h^2-z^2).$$

The vertical component of the velocity field is given by

$$v_z=\frac{g}{24\rho}\left[\frac{\partial}{\partial x}\left(\frac{\rho}{\mu}\frac{\partial\rho}{\partial x}\right)+\frac{\partial}{\partial y}\left(\frac{\rho}{\mu}\frac{\partial\rho}{\partial y}\right)\right](h^2-z^2)^2.$$

The vertical component $v_z\sim U_b h/l$ is much smaller than the horizontal components $(v_x,v_y)\sim U_b$ since $h/l \ll 1$.

== Circular pipe ==
The Ostroumov flow in a horizontal pipe was first explored by M. Emin Erdogan and Phillip C. Chatwin (1967).

== See also ==
- Hagen–Poiseuille flow
- Couette flow
- Erdogan–Chatwin equation
