= Paco Lagerstrom =

Swedish American mathematician

Paco Axel Lagerstrom
- Born: February 24, 1914; Oskarshamn, Sweden
- Died: February 16, 1989 (aged 74); Pasadena, California
- Education: Stockholm University; Princeton University
- Awards: Guggenheim Fellowship
- Scientific career
- Fields: Asymptotic expansion Fluid mechanics
- Workplaces: Caltech
- Thesis: Measure and Integral in Partially Ordered Spaces (1942)
- Doctoral advisor: Salomon Bochner
- Doctoral students: Julian Cole; Athanassios S. Fokas; Milton Van Dyke; Saul Kaplun; Stephen Childress

Paco Axel Lagerstrom (February 24, 1914 – February 16, 1989) was a Swedish-American applied mathematician and aeronautical engineer. He was trained formally in mathematics, but worked for much of his career in aeronautical applications. He was known for work in applying the method of asymptotic expansion to fluid mechanics problems. Several of his works have become classics, including "Matched Asymptotic Expansions: Ideas And Techniques".

== Biography ==
He was born on February 24, 1914, in Oskarshamn, Sweden.

Lagerstrom earned bachelor's and master's degrees, in 1935 and 1939 respectively, at the Stockholm University. He then came to America as a graduate student at Princeton University, earning a PhD in 1942 in mathematics under Salomon Bochner with a dissertation entitled "Measure and Integral in Partially Ordered Spaces". During this time, Lagerstrom was also a mathematics instructor.

He left Princeton in 1944 to work briefly at Bell Aircraft in Niagara Falls, New York until 1945, after which he worked for a similarly brief period at Douglas Aircraft in Santa Monica. While he had already published significant results in pure mathematics, he was, by this time, firmly interested in its applications to fluid dynamic and aerodynamic problems. In 1946, Lagerstrom was recruited by Hans Liepmann to the Guggenheim Aeronautical Laboratory at Caltech. He was later promoted to Professor of Aeronautics in 1952 and Professor of Applied Mathematics in 1967, having departed only briefly to the University of Paris in 1960–1961 as visiting professor on a Guggenheim Fellowship.

He died on February 16, 1989.

== Publications ==
His book "Laminar flow theory", initially published in 1964 in the Theory of Laminar flows, edited by F.K.Moore, is still considered as the standard textbook for fluid mechanics.

- Paco A Lagestrom (1996). Laminar flow theory. Princeton University Press. ISBN 978-0691025988.
- Paco A Lagestrom (1988). Matched Asymptotic Expansions: Ideas and Techniques. Springer. ISBN 978-0387968117.
- Paco A Lagestrom (1953). Notes on Stochastic processes. "Notes on Stochastic processes" (PDF).
- Paco A Lagestrom, Julian D. Cole, Leon Trilling (1949). Problems in the theory of viscous compressible fluids."Problems in the theory of viscous compressible fluids" (PDF).
