= Bruce Malmuth =

American film director (1934–2005)

- Born: February 4, 1934; New York City, New York, U.S.
- Died: June 29, 2005 (aged 71); Los Angeles, California, U.S.
- Occupation(s): Film director, actor
- Relatives: Gail Diane Malmuth (sister) Daniel Saul Malmuth (brother) Norman Malmuth (brother)

Bruce Malmuth (February 4, 1934 – June 29, 2005) was an American film and television director, best known for his work in the action and thriller genres. His works include the Sylvester Stallone-Billy Dee Williams film Nighthawks (1981) and the Steven Seagal vehicle Hard to Kill (1990), as well as several collaborations with fellow director John G. Avildsen.

== Early life ==
Malmuth was born and raised in Brooklyn, New York. Malmuth began making documentaries while serving with the U.S. Army Signal Corps, where he met baseball announcer Walter Red Barber. After his military career, Malmuth directed the New York Yankee games at WPIX radio before entering the film and television industry.

== Career ==
Malmuth was an award-winning director of commercials, earning multiple Clio Awards. His feature directorial debut was Fore Play, a sex comedy anthology film which he co-directed with John G. Avildsen, among others. Avildsen later recommended Malmuth to Sylvester Stallone, who hired him to direct his 1981 action-thriller Nighthawks, after the first director was fired. The film also featured Billy Dee Williams and Rutger Hauer in his American film debut.

Malmuth then directed The Man Who Wasn't There, a 3D comedy starring Steve Guttenberg, and Where Are the Children?, a thriller starring Jill Clayburgh, based on a Mary Higgins Clark novel. He directed episodes of the television series Beauty and the Beast and The Twilight Zone, and the Emmy-winning ABC Afterschool Special A Boy's Dream, which featured Darryl Strawberry. He also did second unit work for his friend John G. Avildsen on Happy New Year (1987).

In 1990, Malmuth directed the Steven Seagal vehicle Hard to Kill, which was a widespread commercial success and grossed $75 million from a $11.5 million budget. The same year, he wrote and directed the play Thanksigiving Cries with his son Evan, which starred a young Tobey Maguire. The play was produced by his brother and business partner Daniel Saul Malmuth, a Columbia Pictures feature film Producer and Development Executive.

Malmuth was the original director attached to the biker action film Stone Cold (1991), but was fired and replaced by Craig R. Baxley after two weeks, who scrapped most of Malmuth's footage and rewrote the script. According to its star Brian Bosworth, Malmuth "personal issues that he couldn't control which poured out on set." Multiple sources described the footage as "unusable."

Malmuth's last film was 1994's Pentathlon, a sports-themed action film starring Dolph Lundgren.

An avid sports and martial arts fan, Malmuth played the role of ring announcer in 1984's The Karate Kid and The Karate Kid Part II, both directed by Avildsen, among other small acting roles.

== Personal life ==
Bruce Malmuth was the brother of Gail Diane Malmuth, Chanel marketing executive, aeronautical scientist Norman Malmuth and Daniel S. Malmuth, an executive for Columbia Pictures and second unit director.

Bruce Malmuth's parents were Selma Malmuth, a couturier fashion designer, and Jacob Malmuth, an attorney and chief of the New York State Insurance Department.

Bruce was married to Cynthia Ruth (Wapner) Malmuth, and spoke French, was a gourmet, body builder, painter, and practical joker.

== Death ==
On June 29, 2005, at Cedars-Sinai Medical Center, Malmuth died at the age of 71 of esophageal cancer.

== Filmography ==
Director

Year	Title	Notes
1975	Fore Play	Segment "Vortex"
1981	Nighthawks	
1983	The Man Who Wasn't There	
1986	Where Are the Children?	
1990	Hard to Kill	
1994	Pentathlon	Also story writer

Actor

Year	Title	Role	Notes
1983	The Man Who Wasn't There	Fireplug Crusher	
1984	The Karate Kid	Ring Announcer	
1986	The Karate Kid Part II	Ring Announcer	
1986	Where Are the Children?	Restaurant Owner	
1987	Happy New Year	Police Lieutenant	Also 2nd unit director
1989	Lean on Me	Burger Joint Manager	
1994	Pentathlon	Erhardt	
