= Maurice Couette =

French physicist

Maurice Marie Alfred Couette
- Born: 9 January 1858; Tours, Second French Empire
- Died: 18 August 1943 (aged 85); Angers, German Occupied France
- Citizenship: French
- Education: Sorbonne
- Known for: Couette flow
- Scientific career
- Fields: Rheology and Fluid mechanics
- Workplaces: Université Catholique de l'Ouest
- Doctoral advisor: Gabriel Lippmann

Maurice Marie Alfred Couette (9 January 1858 in Tours – 18 August 1943 in Angers) was a French physicist known for his studies of fluidity.

Couette is best known for his contributions to rheology and the theory of fluid flow. He designed a concentric cylinder viscometer that he used to accurately measure the viscosity of fluids. The laminar flow observed in the gap between the two cylinders is known as Couette flow. He studied the boundary conditions of a fluid and showed that the "no slip" condition was satisfied for the fluids and wall materials tested.

== Early life and career ==
Couette was born in Tours, France, as the only child of Alfred Ernest Couette, a cloth merchant.

Finishing his education with the Frères des Écoles Chrétiennes he obtained a baccalauréat in humanities and in science, both in 1874, as well as bachelor's degrees in mathematics and physical science (delivered by the Faculté de Science in Poitiers) in 1877 and 1879 respectively. Following a short spell as a lecturer in Angers, he joined the 12th Artillery Regiment at Vincennes for one year of voluntary military service.

In 1881 he settled in Paris and enrolled in the Sorbonne, studying physical science in preparation for the agrégation, a French teaching diploma. Couette later taught in Arcueil and the École Sainte-Geneviève in Paris. At the Sorbonne he studied under Joseph Boussinesq and from 1887 onwards worked at the Physics Research Laboratory under Gabriel Lippmann( who would later receive the Nobel Prize in Physics). Couette also took his doctoral degree on the friction of liquids ("Studies on the Friction of Liquids", Etude sur le frottement des liquides, Gauthiers-Villars 1890).

Soon afterwards he was given a professorship of physics at the Catholic University of Angers (now known as Université Catholique de l'Ouest) as well as other teaching commitments such as at the Free Faculty of Science, the School of Agriculture and several secondary schools in Angers.

Couette was a member of the French Physics Society and retired in 1933.

== Accolades ==
Since 1993, the Prix Maurice Couette is awarded by the Groupe français de Rhéologie.

== Personal life ==
In 1886, Maurice Couette married Jeanne Jenny, who gave birth to eight children, five of whom reached adulthood.
