= Characteristic length =

Dimension for scale of a physical system

In physics, a characteristic length is an important size that defines the spatial scale of a physical system. Often, such a length is used as an input to a formula in order to predict some characteristics of the system, and it is usually required by the construction of a dimensionless quantity, in the general framework of dimensional analysis and in particular applications such as fluid mechanics.

In computational mechanics, a characteristic length is defined to force localization of a stress softening constitutive equation. The length is associated with an integration point. For 2D analysis, it is calculated by taking the square root of the area. For 3D analysis, it is calculated by taking the cubic root of the volume associated to the integration point.

== Examples ==
A characteristic length is usually the volume of a system divided by its surface:

$$L_c = \frac {V_\mathrm{body}} {A_\mathrm{surface}}$$

For example, it is used to calculate flow through circular and non-circular tubes in order to examine flow conditions (i.e., the Reynolds number). In those cases, the characteristic length is the diameter of the pipe or, in case of non-circular tubes, its hydraulic diameter $D_h$:

$$D_h = \frac{4A_c}{p}$$

Where $A_c$ is the cross-sectional area of the pipe and $p$ is its wetted perimeter. It is defined such that it reduces to a circular diameter of D for circular pipes.

For flow through a square duct with a side length of a, the hydraulic diameter $D_h$ is:

$$D_h = \frac{4a^2}{4a} = a$$

For a rectangular duct with side lengths a and b:
$$D_h = \frac{4ab}{2(a+b)} = \frac{2ab}{a+b}$$

For free surfaces (such as in open-channel flow), the wetted perimeter includes only the walls in contact with the fluid.

Similarly, in the combustion chamber of a rocket engine, the characteristic length $L^*$ ("L star") is defined as the chamber volume divided by the throat area. Because the throat of a de Laval nozzle is smaller than the cross section of the combustion chamber, the characteristic length is greater than the physical length of the combustion chamber.

$$L^* = \frac {V_\mathrm{chamber}} {A_\mathrm{injector}}$$
