= Hydraulic roughness =

Measure of friction in water flow

Hydraulic roughness is the measure of the amount of frictional resistance water experiences when passing over land and channel features. It quantifies the impact of surface irregularities and obstructions on the flow of water. One roughness coefficient is Manning's n-value. Manning's n is used extensively around the world to predict the degree of roughness in channels. The coefficient is critical in hydraulic engineering, floodplain management, and sediment transport studies. Flow velocity is strongly dependent on the resistance to flow. An increase in this n value will cause a decrease in the velocity of water flowing across a surface.

== Manning's n ==
The value of Manning's n is affected by many variables. Factors like suspended load, sediment grain size, presence of bedrock or boulders in the stream channel, variations in channel width and depth, and overall sinuosity of the stream channel can all affect Manning's n value. For instance, a narrow, rocky channel with irregular obstructions such as large boulders will have a higher n value than a smooth, straight channel with uniform depth.

Biological factors have the greatest overall effect on Manning's n; key influences include bank stabilization by vegetation, height of grass and brush across a floodplain, and stumps and logs creating natural dams are the main observable influences.

Additionally, seasonal changes in vegetation density and growth can cause fluctuations in Manning's n values.

== Biological Importance ==
Recent studies have found a relationship between hydraulic roughness and salmon spawning habitat; “bed-surface grain size is responsive to hydraulic roughness caused by bank irregularities, bars, and wood debris… We find that wood debris plays an important role at our study sites, not only providing hydraulic roughness but also influencing pool spacing, frequency of textural patches, and the amplitude and wavelength of bank and bar topography and their consequent roughness. Channels with progressively greater hydraulic roughness have systematically finer bed surfaces, presumably due to reduced bed shear stress, resulting in lower channel competence and diminished bed load transport capacity, both of which promote textural fining”. Textural fining of stream beds can affect more than just salmon spawning habitats, “bar and wood roughness create a greater variety of textural patches, offering a range of aquatic habitats that may promote biologic diversity or be of use to specific animals at different life stages.”
