= Hydraulic drop =

A hydraulic drop is a type of local phenomena found in open channel flow. It is a rapid change in the depth of flow from a high stage to a low stage that results in a steep depression in the water surface. It is often caused by an abrupt change in the channel slope. Another type of local phenomena found in an open channel flow is the hydraulic jump.
