= Antoine de Chézy =

French physicist and engineer (1718–1798)

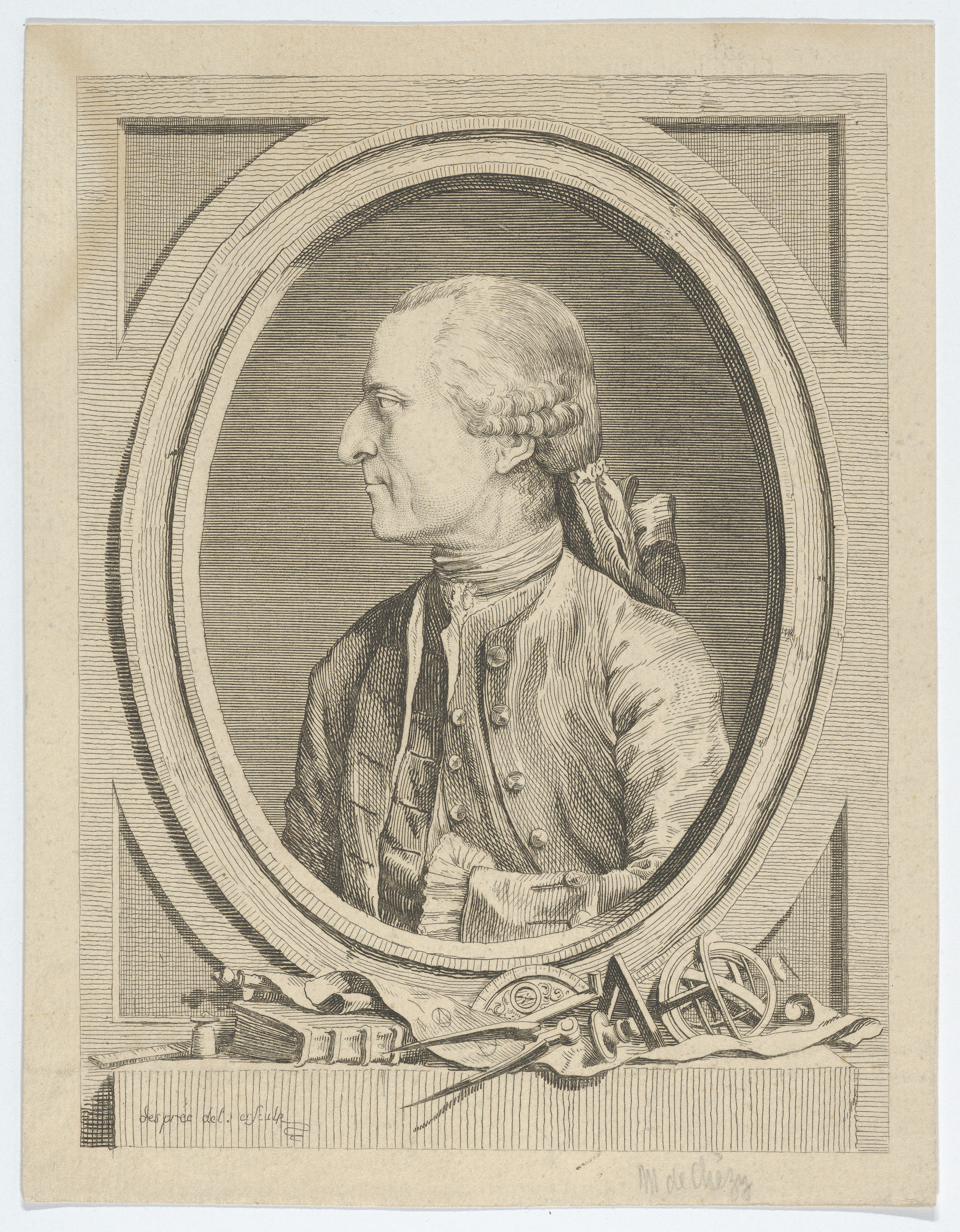
- Antoine de Chézy, ca. 1772–76, by Louis Jean Desprez, The Metropoltain Museum of Art
- Born: September 1, 1718; Châlons-en-Champagne, France
- Died: October 5, 1798 (aged 80); Paris, France
- Known for: Chézy formula
- Scientific career
- Fields: Physics; Hydraulics

Antoine de Chézy (September 1, 1718 – October 5, 1798), also called Antoine Chézy, was a French physicist and hydraulics engineer who contributed greatly to the study of fluid mechanics and designed a canal for the Paris water supply. He is known for developing a similarity parameter for predicting the flow characteristics of one channel based on the measurements of another, known today as the Chézy formula. The Chézy equation is a pioneering formula in the field of fluid mechanics, and was expanded and modified by Irish engineer Robert Manning in 1889 as the Manning formula. The Chézy formula concerns the velocity of water flowing through conduits and is widely celebrated for its use in open channel flow calculations. By the definition of open channel, the Chézy formula also applies to partially-full pipe flow.

Chézy was born September 1, 1718, in Châlons-en-Champagne, France. Chézy graduated with honors from the Ecole des Ponts et Chaussées and worked closely with Jean-Rodolphe Perronet, the first director of the school. He contributed to a wide range of projects that we would describe today as civil engineering, including the construction of bridges, canals, and streets in Paris. Chézy and Perronet were tasked to assess the magnitude of water flow that could be diverted from the Yvette River to improve the Paris water supply. They sought to predict the flow of water in open channels based on analytical methods. In this pursuit, Chézy built model channels on which he ran tests to determine the factors that influence flow in an open channel. The famed Chézy formula continues to be used in open channel analyses today. In 1798, he became Director of the Ecole Nationale Supérieure des Ponts-et-Chaussées after teaching there for many years. Antoine de Chézy died October 5, 1798, in Paris after serving as director of the École Nationale des Ponts et Chaussées for less than one year.

His son was Antoine-Léonard de Chézy (1773–1832), a famous orientalist.
