= Hydraulic diameter =

Measure of a channel flow efficiency

The hydraulic diameter, D_{H}, is a commonly used term when handling flow in non-circular tubes and channels. Using this term, one can calculate many things in the same way as for a round tube. When the cross-section is uniform along the tube or channel length, it is defined as

$$D_\text{H} = \frac{4A}{P},$$

where

A is the cross-sectional area of the flow,
P is the wetted perimeter of the cross-section.

More intuitively, the hydraulic diameter can be understood as a function of the hydraulic radius R_{H}, which is defined as the cross-sectional area of the channel divided by the wetted perimeter. Here, the wetted perimeter includes all surfaces acted upon by shear stress from the fluid.

$$R_\text{H} = \frac{A}{P},$$

$$D_\text{H} = 4R_\text{H},$$

Note that for the case of a circular pipe,

$$D_\text{H} =\frac{4 \pi R^{2}}{2 \pi R}=2R$$

The need for the hydraulic diameter arises due to the use of a single dimension in the case of a dimensionless quantity such as the Reynolds number, which prefers a single variable for flow analysis rather than the set of variables as listed in the table below. The Manning formula contains a quantity called the hydraulic radius. Despite what the name may suggest, the hydraulic diameter is not twice the hydraulic radius, but four times larger.

Hydraulic diameter is mainly used for calculations involving turbulent flow. Secondary flows can be observed in non-circular ducts as a result of turbulent shear stress in the turbulent flow. Hydraulic diameter is also used in calculation of heat transfer in internal-flow problems.

== Non-uniform and non-circular cross-section channels ==
In the more general case, channels with non-uniform non-circular cross-sectional area, such as the Tesla valve, the hydraulic diameter is defined as:

$$D_\text{H} = \frac{4V}{S},$$

where

V is the total wetted volume of the channel,
S is the total wetted surface area.

This definition is reduced to $\frac{4A}{P}$ for uniform non-circular cross-section channels, and $2R$ for circular pipes.

== List of hydraulic diameters ==
| Geometry | Hydraulic diameter | Comment |
|---|---|---|
| Circular tube | $D_\text{H} = \frac{4\cdot\frac{ \pi D^2 }{4}}{\pi D} = D$ | For a circular tube the hydraulic diameter is simply the diameter of the tube. |
| Annulus | $D_\text{H} = \frac{4 \cdot \frac{\pi (D_\text{out}^2 - D_\text{in}^2)}{4}} {\pi (D_\text{out} + D_\text{in})} = D_\text{out} - D_\text{in}$ | |
| Square duct | $D_\text{H} = \frac{4 a^2}{4a} = a$ | here a represents the length of a side, not the cross sectional area |
| Rectangular duct (fully filled). The duct is closed so that the wetted perimeter consists of the 4 sides of the duct. | $D_\text{H} = \frac{4 ab}{2(a+b)} = \frac{2 ab}{a+b}$ | For the limiting case of a very wide duct, i.e. a slot of width b, where b ≫ a, then D_{H} = 2a. |
| Channel of water or partially filled rectangular duct. Open from top by definition so that the wetted perimeter consists of the 3 sides of the duct (2 on the side and the base). | $D_\text{H} = \frac{4 ab}{2a + b}$ | For the limiting case of a very wide duct, i.e. a slot of width b, where b ≫ a, and a is the water depth, then D_{H} = 4a. |

For a fully filled duct or pipe whose cross-section is a convex regular polygon, the hydraulic diameter is equivalent to the diameter $D$ of a circle inscribed within the wetted perimeter. This can be seen as follows: The $N$-sided regular polygon is a union of $N$ triangles, each of height $D/2$ and base $B = D \tan(\pi/N)$. Each such triangle contributes $BD/4$ to the total area and $B$ to the total perimeter, giving

$$D_\text{H} = 4\frac{N BD/4}{NB} = D$$

for the hydraulic diameter.

== See also ==
- Equivalent spherical diameter
- Hydraulic radius
- Darcy friction factor
