= Manning formula =

Estimate of velocity in open channel flows

The Manning formula or Manning's equation is an empirical formula estimating the average velocity of a liquid in an open channel flow (flowing in a conduit that does not completely enclose the liquid). However, this equation is also used for calculation of flow variables in case of flow in partially full conduits, as they also possess a free surface like that of open channel flow. All flow in so-called open channels is driven by gravity.

It was first presented by the French engineer Philippe Gaspard Gauckler in 1867, and later re-developed by the Irish engineer Robert Manning in 1890. Thus, the formula is also known in Europe as the Gauckler–Manning formula or Gauckler–Manning–Strickler formula (after Albert Strickler).

The Gauckler–Manning formula is used to estimate the average velocity of water flowing in an open channel in locations where it is not practical to construct a weir or flume to measure flow with greater accuracy. Manning's equation is also commonly used as part of a numerical step method, such as the standard step method, for delineating the free surface profile of water flowing in an open channel.

== Formulation ==
The Gauckler–Manning formula states:

$$V = \frac{k}{n} {R_h}^{2/3} \, S^{1/2}$$

where:

- V is the cross-sectional average velocity (dimension of L/T; units of ft/s or m/s);
- n is the Gauckler–Manning coefficient (dimension of T/L^{1/3} and units of s/ft^{1/3} or s/m^{1/3}, although units of n are often omitted);
- R_{h} is the hydraulic radius (L; ft, m);
- S is the stream slope or hydraulic gradient, the linear hydraulic head loss (dimension of L/L, units of m/m or ft/ft); it is the same as the channel bed slope when the water depth is uniform. (S = h_{f}/L).
- k is a conversion factor between SI and English units. It can be left off, as long as it is noted and the units in the n term are corrected. If n is left in the traditional SI units, k is just the dimensional analysis to convert to English. k = 1 for SI units, and k = 1.49 for English units. (Note: (1 m)^{1/3}/s = (3.2808399 ft)^{1/3}/s = 1.4859 (ft^{1/3})/s)

Note: the Strickler coefficient (Ks) is the reciprocal of Manning coefficient, Ks=1/n, having dimension of L^{1/3}/T and units of m^{1/3}/s; it varies from 20 m^{1/3}/s (rough stone and rough surface) to 80 m^{1/3}/s (smooth concrete and cast iron).

The discharge formula, Q = A V, can be used to rewrite Gauckler–Manning's equation by substitution for V. Solving for Q then allows an estimate of the volumetric flow rate (discharge) without knowing the limiting or actual flow velocity.

The formula can be obtained by use of dimensional analysis. In the 2000s this formula was derived theoretically using the phenomenological theory of turbulence.

== Hydraulic radius ==
The hydraulic radius is one of the properties of a channel that controls water discharge. It also determines how much work the channel can do, for example, in moving sediment. All else equal, a river with a larger hydraulic radius will have a higher flow velocity, and also a larger cross sectional area through which that faster water can travel. This means the greater the hydraulic radius, the larger volume of water the channel can carry.

Based on the 'constant shear stress at the boundary' assumption, hydraulic radius is defined as the ratio of the channel's cross-sectional area of the flow to its wetted perimeter (the portion of the cross-section's perimeter that is "wet"):

$$R_h = \frac{A}{P}$$

where:

- R_{h} is the hydraulic radius (L);
- A is the cross sectional area of flow (L^{2});
- P is the wetted perimeter (L).

For channels of a given width, the hydraulic radius is greater for deeper channels. In wide rectangular channels, the hydraulic radius is approximated by the flow depth.

The hydraulic radius is not half the hydraulic diameter as the name may suggest, but one quarter in the case of a full pipe. It is a function of the shape of the pipe, channel, or river in which the water is flowing.

Hydraulic radius is also important in determining a channel's efficiency (its ability to move water and sediment), and is one of the properties used by water engineers to assess the channel's capacity.

== Gauckler–Manning coefficient ==
The Gauckler–Manning coefficient, often denoted as n, is an empirically derived coefficient, which is dependent on many factors, including surface roughness and sinuosity. When field inspection is not possible, the best method to determine n is to use photographs of river channels where n has been determined using Gauckler–Manning's formula.

The friction coefficients across weirs and orifices are less subjective than n along a natural (earthen, stone or vegetated) channel reach. Cross sectional area, as well as n, will likely vary along a natural channel. Accordingly, more error is expected in estimating the average velocity by assuming a Manning's n, than by direct sampling (i.e., with a current flowmeter), or measuring it across weirs, flumes or orifices.

In natural streams, n values vary greatly along its reach, and will even vary in a given reach of channel with different stages of flow. Most research shows that n will decrease with stage, at least up to bank-full. Overbank n values for a given reach will vary greatly depending on the time of year and the velocity of flow. Summer vegetation will typically have a significantly higher n value due to leaves and seasonal vegetation. Research has shown, however, that n values are lower for individual shrubs with leaves than for the shrubs without leaves. This is due to the ability of the plant's leaves to streamline and flex as the flow passes them thus lowering the resistance to flow. High velocity flows will cause some vegetation (such as grasses and forbs) to lay flat, where a lower velocity of flow through the same vegetation will not.

In open channels, the Darcy–Weisbach equation is valid using the hydraulic diameter as equivalent pipe diameter. It is the only best and sound method to estimate the energy loss in human made open channels. For various reasons (mainly historical reasons), empirical resistance coefficients (e.g. Chézy, Gauckler–Manning–Strickler) were and are still used. The Chézy coefficient was introduced in 1768 while the Gauckler–Manning coefficient was first developed in 1865, well before the classical pipe flow resistance experiments in the 1920–1930s. Historically both the Chézy and the Gauckler–Manning coefficients were expected to be constant and functions of the roughness only. But it is now well recognised that these coefficients are only constant for a range of flow rates. Most friction coefficients (except perhaps the Darcy–Weisbach friction factor) are estimated 100% empirically and they apply only to fully rough turbulent water flows under steady flow conditions.

One of the most important applications of the Manning equation is its use in sewer design. Sewers are often constructed as circular pipes. It has long been accepted that the value of n varies with the flow depth in partially filled circular pipes. A complete set of explicit equations that can be used to calculate the depth of flow and other unknown variables when applying the Manning equation to circular pipes is available. These equations account for the variation of n with the depth of flow in accordance with the curves presented by Camp.

== Authors of flow formulas ==
- Albert Brahms (1692–1758)
- Antoine de Chézy (1718–1798)
- Henry Darcy (1803–1858)
- Julius Ludwig Weisbach (1806-1871)
- Philippe Gaspard Gauckler (1826–1905)
- Robert Manning (1816–1897)
- Wilhelm Rudolf Kutter (1818–1888)
- Henri Bazin (1843–1917)
- Ludwig Prandtl (1875–1953)
- Paul Richard Heinrich Blasius (1883–1970)
- Albert Strickler (1887–1963)
- Cyril Frank Colebrook (1910–1997)

== See also ==
- Chézy formula
- Darcy–Weisbach equation
- Hydraulics
