= Albert Brahms =

Frisian dike judge

- Born: October 24, 1692; Sanderahm, Sande, Friesland
- Died: August 3, 1758 (aged 65); New Oberahmergroden, Sande, Friesland
- Occupations: Farmer; Judge

Albert Brahms (October 24, 1692 – August 3, 1758) was a Frisian dike judge, an elected community leader responsible for maintaining the dikes that protected the area against the Wadden Sea, and a pioneer of hydraulic engineering.

== Biography ==
Brahms was born on October 24, 1692, in Sanderahm, Sande, in what is now the Friesland district of Lower Saxony, Germany. He was elected as dike judge in 1718, after the disastrous Christmas flood of 1717, which had caused many deaths, and he retained the position until 1752.

For his work in dike engineering, he was honored as a "princely geometer" of the Principality of Anhalt-Zerbst (German: "hochfürstlich Anhalt-Zerbstischer Geometer"), to which Sande at that time belonged.

== Coastal engineering ==
In his position as dike judge, Brahms arranged for the establishment of physical benchmarks, located on stable ground near the coast, for use in measuring tide levels and storm surges.

In 1754 and 1757, Brahms published a two-volume book on dike maintenance, the Anfangsgründe der Deich und Wasser-Baukunst [Principles of Dike and Aquatic Engineering]. In it he recommended regularly comparing the height of the dikes with the high tide level. He kept the first known records of the tide levels on the North Sea coast of Germany, and established records of storm surge levels. He also developed mathematical models of local wave heights as being proportional to the square root of water depth and of the motion of sediments in water channels.

Niemeyer, Eiben & Rohde (1996) write that his book was "unique" and "far ahead of his contemporaries", noting that Brahms "already recognized nearly all key problems" as they are now understood "and delivered solutions which still must be regarded as pathbreaking".
