= Wetted perimeter =

Perimeter of a cross sectional area that is wet

Cross sectional area of a trapezoidal open channel, red highlights wetted perimeter

Change of wetted perimeter (blue) of trapezoidal canal as a function of angle ψ.

The wetted perimeter is the perimeter of the cross sectional area that is "wet". The length of the line of the intersection of channel wetted surface with a cross sectional plane normal to the flow direction. The term wetted perimeter is common in civil engineering, environmental engineering, hydrology, geomorphology, and heat transfer applications; it is associated with the hydraulic diameter or hydraulic radius. Engineers commonly cite the cross sectional area of a river.

The wetted perimeter can be defined mathematically as

$$P = \sum_{i=0}^\infty{l_i}$$

where l_{i} is the length of each surface in contact with the aqueous body.

In open channel flow, the wetted perimeter is defined as the surface of the channel bottom and sides in direct contact with the aqueous body. Friction losses typically increase with an increasing wetted perimeter, resulting in a decrease in head. In a practical experiment, one is able to measure the wetted perimeter with a tape measure weighted down to the river bed to get a more accurate measurement.

When a channel is much wider than it is deep, the wetted perimeter approximates the channel width.

== See also ==
- Hydrological transport model
- Manning formula
- Hydraulic radius
