= Hydrological optimization =

Hydrological optimization applies mathematical optimization techniques (such as dynamic programming, linear programming, integer programming, or quadratic programming) to water-related problems. These problems may be for surface water, groundwater, or the combination. The work is interdisciplinary, and may be done by hydrologists, civil engineers, environmental engineers, and operations researchers.

== Simulation versus optimization ==
Groundwater and surface water flows can be studied with hydrologic simulation. A typical program used for this work is MODFLOW. However, simulation models cannot easily help make management decisions, as simulation is descriptive. Simulation shows what would happen given a certain set of conditions. Optimization, by contrast, finds the best solution for a set of conditions. Optimization models have three parts:

1. An objective, such as "Minimize cost"
2. Decision variables, which correspond to the options available to management
3. Constraints, which describe the technical or physical requirements imposed on the options

To use hydrological optimization, a simulation is run to find constraint coefficients for the optimization. An engineer or manager can then add costs or benefits associated with a set of possible decisions, and solve the optimization model to find the best solution.

== Examples of problems solved with hydrological optimization ==
- Contaminant remediation in aquifers. The decision problem is where to locate wells, and choose a pumping rate, to minimize the cost to prevent spread of a contaminant. The constraints are associated with the hydrogeological flows.
- Water allocation to improve wetlands. This optimization model recommends water allocation and invasive vegetation control to improve wetland habitat of priority bird species. These recommendations are subject to constraints like water availability, spatial connectivity, hydraulic infrastructure capacities, vegetation responses, and available financial resources.
- Maximizing well abstraction subject to environmental flow constraints. The goal is to measure the effects of each user's water use on other users and on the environment, as accurately as possible, and then optimize over the available feasible solutions.
- Improving water quality. A simple optimization model identifies the cost-minimizing mix of best management practices to reduce the excess of nutrients in a watershed.
- Hydrological optimization is now being proposed for use with smart markets for water-related resources.
- Pipe network optimization with genetic algorithms.

== PDE-constrained optimization ==
Partial differential equations (PDEs) are widely used to describe hydrological processes, suggesting that a high degree of accuracy in hydrological optimization should strive to incorporate PDE constraints into a given optimization. Common examples of PDEs used in hydrology include:

- Groundwater flow equation
- Primitive equations
- Saint-Venant equations

Other environmental processes to consider as inputs include:

- Evapotranspiration
- Geomorphology
- Sediment transport

== See also ==
- Drainage research
- Geographic information system
- Integrated water resources management
- Optimal control
- Pipe network analysis
- Water in California
