= Water gap (disambiguation) =

A water gap is an opening which flowing water has carved through a mountain range.

Water gap or Watergap may also refer to:

- Watergap, Kentucky, a community in Floyd County, Kentucky, US
- WaterGAP, a global freshwater model
