= Water resources =

Sources of water that are potentially useful for humans

Distribution of freshwater resources by type
1. Glaciers (69.0%)
2. Groundwater (30.0%)
3. Other freshwater (e.g. soil moisture) (0.70%)
4. Directly accessible water (0.30%)

Water resources are natural resources of water that are potentially useful for humans. For example, they serve as a source of drinking water or irrigation water. These resources may consist of freshwater from natural sources or water produced artificially from other sources, such as reclaimed water (wastewater) or desalinated water (seawater). Approximately 97% of the water on Earth is salt water, and only 3% is fresh water; slightly over two-thirds of this is frozen in glaciers and polar ice caps. The remaining unfrozen freshwater is found mainly as groundwater, with only a small fraction present above ground or in the air. Natural sources of fresh water include frozen water, groundwater, surface water, and under river flow. People use water resources for agricultural, household, and industrial activities.

Water resources are under threat from multiple issues. There is water scarcity, water pollution, water conflict, and climate change. Fresh water is in principle a renewable resource. However, the world's supply of groundwater is steadily decreasing. Groundwater depletion (or overdrafting) is occurring for example in Asia, South America and North America.

== Natural sources of fresh water ==
Natural sources of fresh water include surface water, under river flow, groundwater and frozen water.

=== Surface water ===
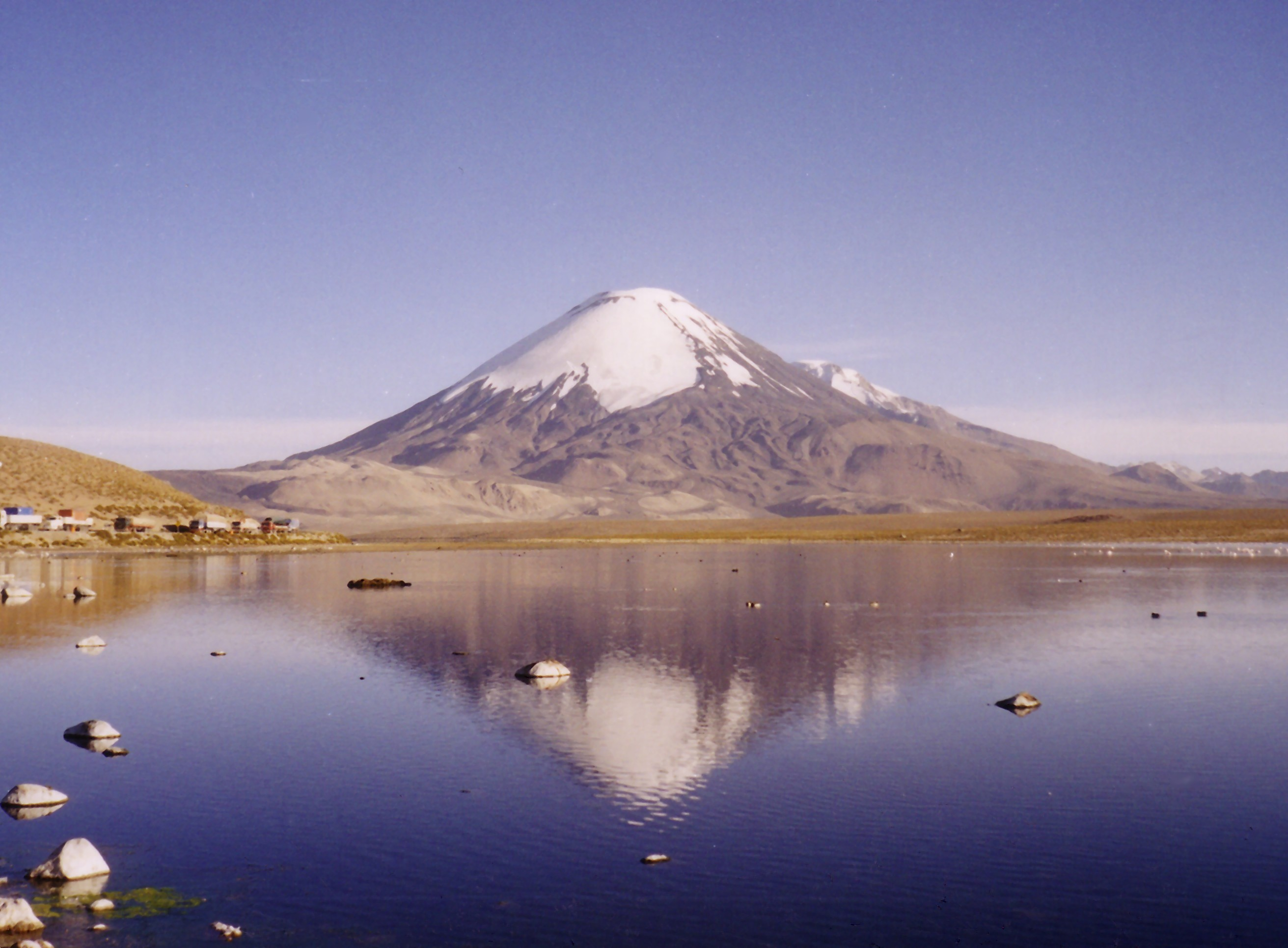
Lake Chungará and Parinacota volcano in northern Chile

Surface water refers to water that is found on the surface of the Earth. This includes but not limited to river, lake, ponds or fresh water wetland. Surface water is naturally replenished by precipitation, and naturally lost through discharge to the oceans, evaporation, evapotranspiration, drought, climate change, population growth, deforestation, land degradation, and groundwater recharge. The only natural input to any surface water system is precipitation within its watershed. The total quantity of water in that system at any given time is also dependent on many other factors. These factors include storage capacity in lakes, wetlands and artificial reservoirs, the permeability of the soil beneath these storage bodies, the runoff characteristics of the land in the watershed, the timing of the precipitation and local evaporation rates. Furthermore, other human factors such as temperature, climate change, topography, Vegetation cover, windspeed, relative humidity, and solar radiation has an effect on water loss. All of these factors also affect the proportions of water loss.

Humans often increase storage capacity by constructing reservoirs, rainwater harvesting systems, Managed Aquifier Recharge (MAR), Watershed Conservation, Construction of retention, and detention basins, floodplain restoration, creation of artificial rains; and decrease it by draining wetlands, land reclamation, urbanisation, river channelisation, over-abstraction of water, sedimentation by deforestation and poor reservoir management. Humans often increase runoff quantities and velocities by paving areas and channelizing the stream flow.

Natural surface water can be augmented by importing surface water from another watershed through a canal or pipeline. Other methods also includes rain harvesting, construction of dams and reservoirs, desalination, cloud seeding, and artificial recharge.

Brazil is estimated to have the largest supply of fresh water in the world with 5,661 billion m³/year followed by Russia, and Canada, with about 4,312 billion m³/year and 2,850 billion m³/year respectively according to rècent World Bank summaries. However, this is renewable freshwater and not freshwater physically stored in lakes,groundwater or glaciers.

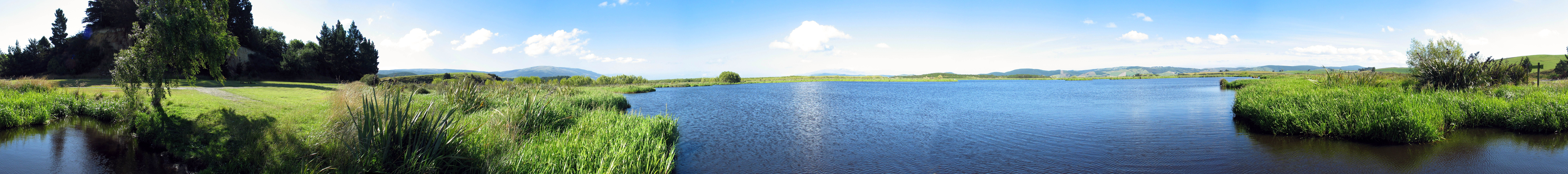
Panorama of a natural wetland (Sinclair Wetlands, New Zealand)

==== Water from glaciers ====
Glacier runoff is considered to be surface water. The Himalayas, which are often called "The Roof of the World", contain some of the most extensive and rough high altitude areas on Earth as well as the greatest area of glaciers and permafrost outside of the poles. Ten of Asia's largest rivers flow from there, and more than a billion people's livelihoods depend on them. To complicate matters, temperatures there are rising more rapidly than the global average. In Nepal, the temperature has risen by 0.6 degrees Celsius over the last decade, whereas globally, the Earth has warmed approximately 0.7 degrees Celsius over the last hundred years.

=== Groundwater ===
Relative groundwater travel times in the subsurface

Groundwater is the water present beneath Earth's surface in rock and soil pore spaces and in the fractures of rock formations. About 30 percent of all readily available fresh water in the world is groundwater. A unit of rock or an unconsolidated deposit is called an aquifer when it can yield a usable quantity of water. The depth at which soil pore spaces or fractures and voids in rock become completely saturated with water is called the water table. Groundwater is recharged from the surface; it may discharge from the surface naturally at springs and seeps, and can form oases or wetlands. Groundwater is also often withdrawn for agricultural, municipal, and industrial use by constructing and operating extraction wells. The study of the distribution and movement of groundwater is hydrogeology, also called groundwater hydrology.

Typically, groundwater is thought of as water flowing through shallow aquifers, but, in the technical sense, it can also contain soil moisture, permafrost (frozen soil), immobile water in very low permeability bedrock, and deep geothermal or oil formation water. Groundwater is hypothesized to provide lubrication that can possibly influence the movement of faults. It is likely that much of Earth's subsurface contains some water, which may be mixed with other fluids in some instances.

==== Under river flow ====
Throughout the course of a river, the total volume of water transported downstream will often be a combination of the visible free water flow together with a substantial contribution flowing through rocks and sediments that underlie the river and its floodplain called the hyporheic zone. For many rivers in large valleys, this unseen component of flow may greatly exceed the visible flow. The hyporheic zone often forms a dynamic interface between surface water and groundwater from aquifers, exchanging flow between rivers and aquifers that may be fully charged or depleted. This is especially significant in karst areas where pot-holes and underground rivers are common.

== Artificial sources of usable water ==
This refers to structured systems designed by humans for the collection, storage, treatment, and the convertion of water for human use. The purpose of this system is to help mitigate the shortage of water especially in regions where there is little to no rainfall or high demand of water. There are several artificial sources of fresh water; treated wastewater (reclaimed water), atmospheric water generators and Desalinated seawater. Other important sources includes: rainwater harvesting systems, wells, and boreholes, artificial recharge ponds, dams and reservoirs. It is important to consider the economic and environmental side effects of these technologies.

=== Wastewater reuse ===
Water reclamation is the process of converting municipal wastewater or sewage and industrial wastewater into water that can be reused for a variety of purposes. It is also called wastewater reuse, water reuse or water recycling. There are many types of reuse. It is possible to reuse water in this way in cities or for irrigation in agriculture. Other types of reuse are environmental reuse, industrial reuse, and reuse for drinking water, whether planned or not. Reuse may include irrigation of gardens and agricultural fields or replenishing surface water and groundwater. This latter is also known as groundwater recharge. Reused water also serve various needs in residences such as toilet flushing, businesses, and industry. It is possible to treat wastewater to reach drinking water standards. Injecting reclaimed water into the water supply distribution system is known as direct potable reuse. Drinking reclaimed water is not typical. Reusing treated municipal wastewater for irrigation is a long-established practice. This is especially so in arid countries. Reusing wastewater as part of sustainable water management allows water to remain an alternative water source for human activities. This can reduce scarcity. It also eases pressures on groundwater and other natural water bodies.

There are several technologies used to treat wastewater for reuse. A combination of these technologies can meet strict treatment standards and make sure that the processed water is hygienically safe, meaning free from pathogens. The following are some of the typical technologies: Ozonation, ultrafiltration, aerobic treatment (membrane bioreactor), forward osmosis, reverse osmosis, and advanced oxidation, or activated carbon. Some water-demanding activities do not require high grade water. In this case, wastewater can be reused with little or no treatment.

=== Desalinated water ===
Desalination is the artificial process by which salt water (generally sea water) is converted to fresh water. More generally, desalination is the removal of salts and minerals from a substance. It is possible to desalinate saltwater, especially sea water, to produce water for human consumption or irrigation, producing brine as a by-product.

Interest in desalination mostly focuses on cost-effective provision of fresh water for human use. Along with recycled wastewater, it is one of the few water resources independent of rainfall. As stress on the need for freshwater intensifies globally, desalination has become a key part of strategies for global water security. According to a 2019 review in Science of the Total Environment, around 95 million cubic meters per day of desalinated water is produced worldwide, and the demand for desalinated water is expected to grow significantly to help close the global water supply gap.

=== Research into other options ===
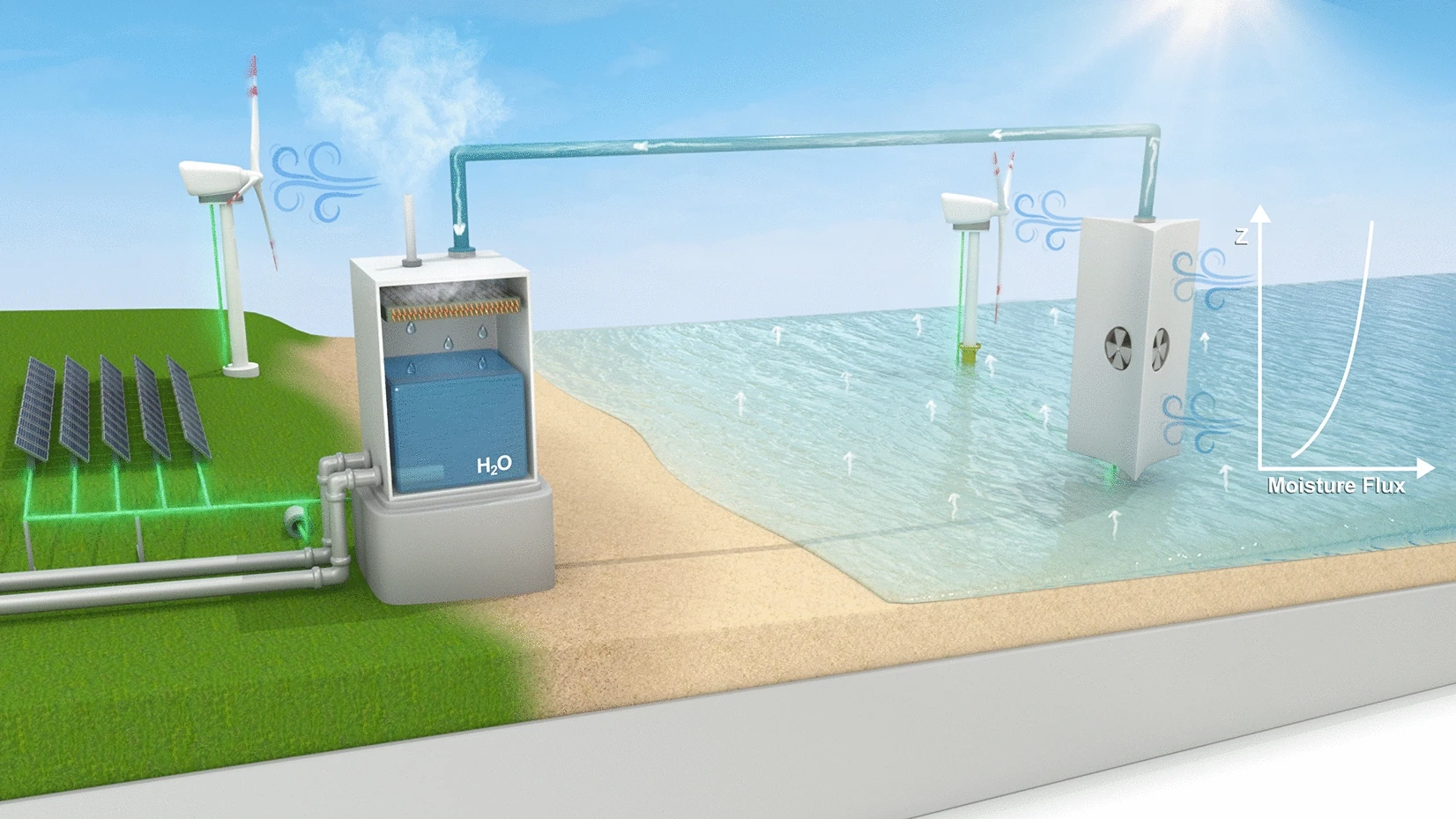
Schematic illustration of a proposed approach for capturing moisture above the ocean surface and transporting it to proximal land for improving water security

Researchers proposed air capture over oceans which would "significantly increasing freshwater through the capture of humid air over oceans" to address present and, especially, future water scarcity/insecurity.

A 2021 study proposed hypothetical portable solar-powered atmospheric water harvesting devices. However, such off-the-grid generation may sometimes "undermine efforts to develop permanent piped infrastructure" among other problems.

== Water uses ==
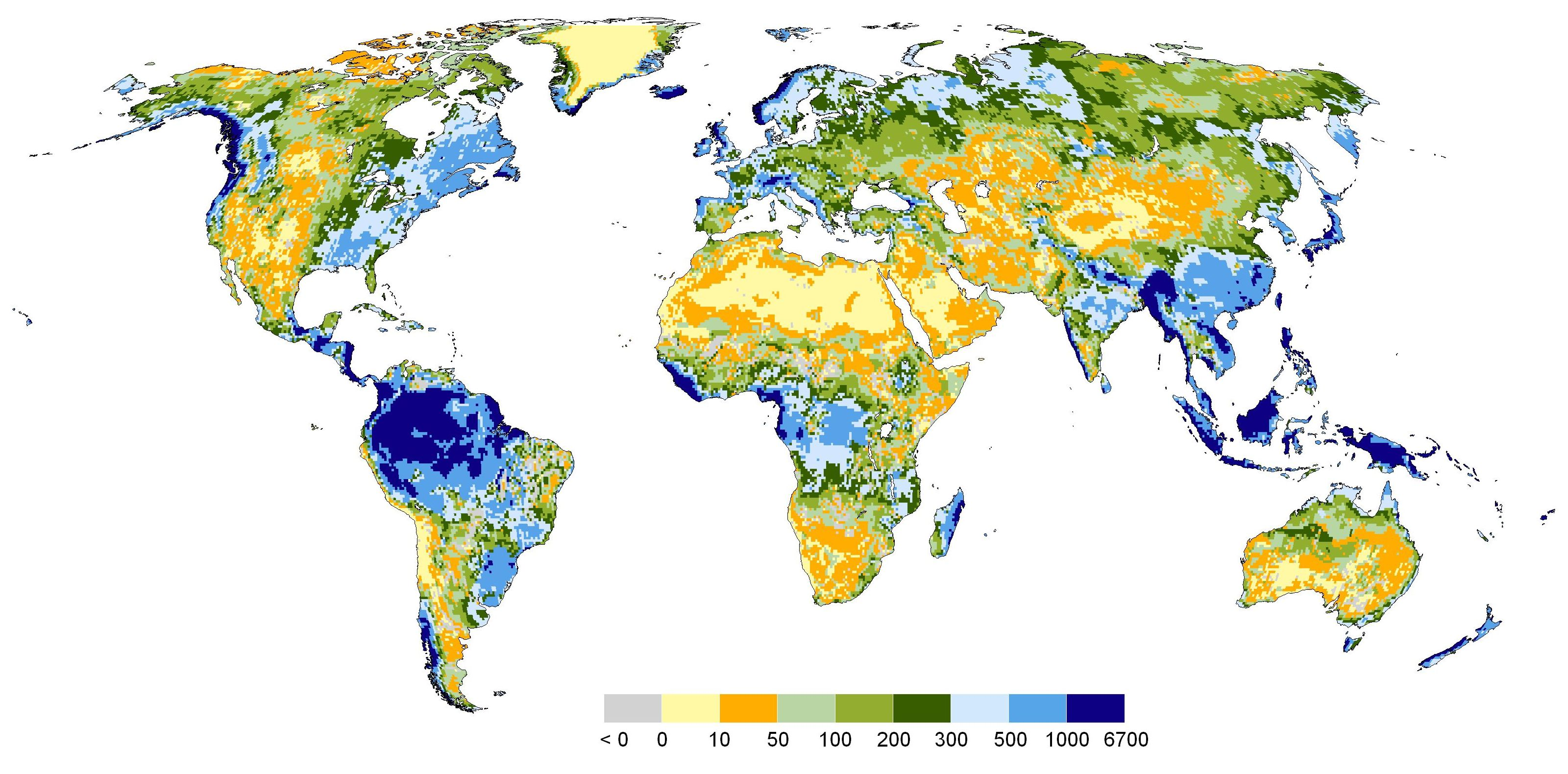
Total renewable freshwater resources of the world, in mm/year (1 mm is equivalent to 1 L of water per m^{2}) (long-term average for the years 1961–1990). Resolution is 0.5° longitude x 0.5° latitude (equivalent to 55 km x 55 km at the equator). Computed by the global freshwater model WaterGAP.

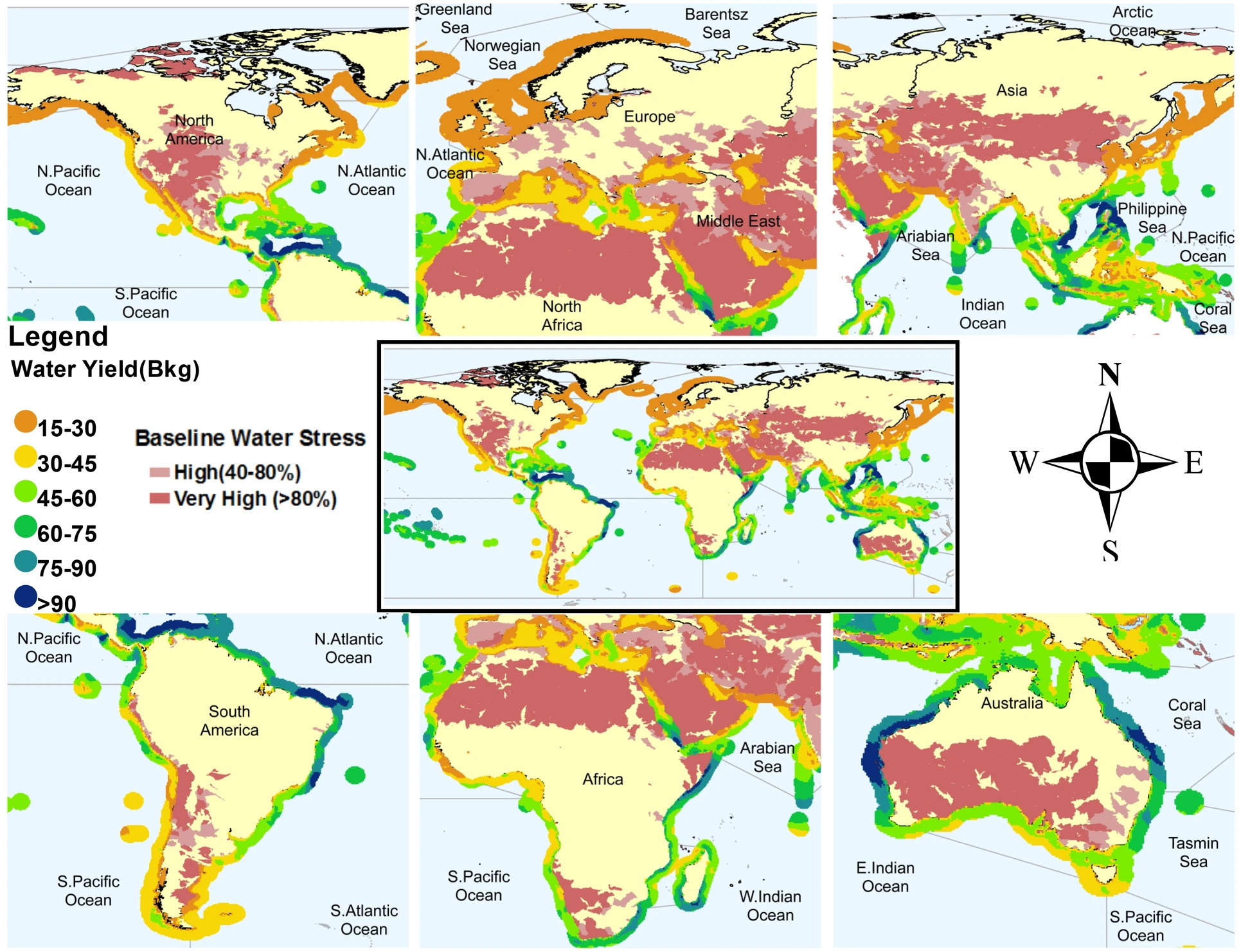
Map of water stress and spatial variability of water yield along the delineated near-offshore region of 200 km across the world

The total quantity of water available at any given time is an important consideration. Some human water users have an intermittent need for water. For example, many farms require large quantities of water in the spring, and no water at all in the winter. Other users have a continuous need for water, such as a power plant that requires water for cooling. Over the long term the average rate of precipitation within a watershed is the upper bound for average consumption of natural surface water from that watershed.

=== Agriculture and other irrigation ===
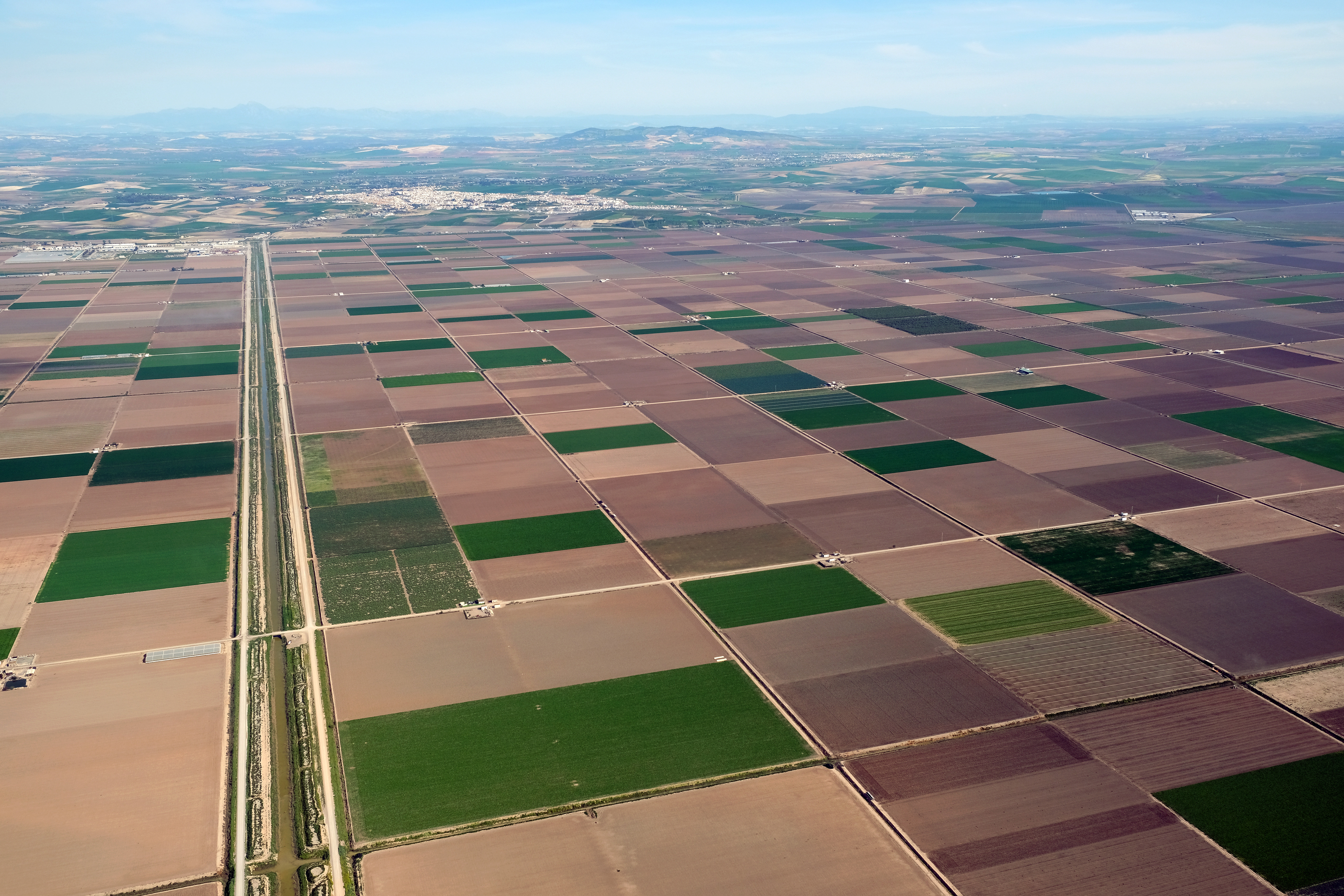
Irrigation of agricultural fields in Andalusia, Spain. Irrigation canal on the left.

Irrigation in agriculture is the practice of applying controlled amounts of water to land to help grow crops, landscape plants, and lawns. Irrigation has been a key aspect of agriculture for over 5,000 years and has been developed by many cultures worldwide. Irrigation helps to grow crops, maintain landscapes, and revegetate disturbed soils in dry areas and during times of below-average rainfall. In addition to these uses, irrigation is also employed to protect crops from frost, suppress weed growth in grain fields, and prevent soil consolidation. It is also used to cool livestock, reduce dust, dispose of sewage, and support mining operations. Drainage, which involves the removal of surface and sub-surface water from a given location, is often studied in conjunction with irrigation. Irrigation and drainage improvements are not necessarily mutually exclusive. Often both may be required together to assure sustained high-level production of crops. For a discussion of the role of drainage practices in agriculture.

Several irrigation methods differ in how water is supplied to plants. Surface irrigation, also known as gravity irrigation, is the oldest form of irrigation and has been in use for thousands of years. In sprinkler irrigation, water is piped to one or more central locations within the field and distributed by overhead high-pressure water devices. Micro-irrigation is a system that distributes water under low pressure through a piped network and applies it as a small discharge to each plant. Micro-irrigation uses less pressure and water flow than sprinkler irrigation. Drip irrigation delivers water directly to the root zone of plants. Subirrigation has been used in field crops in areas with high water tables for many years. It involves artificially raising the water table to moisten the soil below the root zone of plants.

=== Industries ===
It is estimated that 22% of worldwide water is used in industry. Major industrial users include hydroelectric dams, thermoelectric power plants, which use water for cooling, ore and oil refineries, which use water in chemical processes, and manufacturing plants, which use water as a solvent. Water withdrawal can be very high for certain industries, but consumption is generally much lower than that of agriculture.

Water is used in renewable power generation. Hydroelectric power derives energy from the force of water flowing downhill, driving a turbine connected to a generator. This hydroelectricity is a low-cost, non-polluting, renewable energy source. Significantly, hydroelectric power can also be used for load following unlike most renewable energy sources which are intermittent. Ultimately, the energy in a hydroelectric power plant is supplied by the sun. Heat from the sun evaporates water, which condenses as rain in higher altitudes and flows downhill. Pumped-storage hydroelectric plants also exist, which use grid electricity to pump water uphill when demand is low, and use the stored water to produce electricity when demand is high.

Thermoelectric power plants using cooling towers have high consumption, nearly equal to their withdrawal, as most of the withdrawn water is evaporated as part of the cooling process. The withdrawal, however, is lower than in once-through cooling systems.

Water is also used in many large scale industrial processes, such as thermoelectric power production, oil refining, fertilizer production and other chemical plant use, and natural gas extraction from shale rock. Discharge of untreated water from industrial uses is pollution. Pollution includes discharged solutes and increased water temperature (thermal pollution).

=== Drinking water and domestic use (households) ===
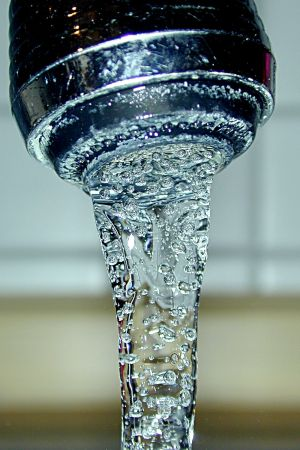
Drinking water

It is estimated that 8% of worldwide water use is for domestic purposes. These include drinking water, bathing, cooking, toilet flushing, cleaning, laundry and gardening. Basic domestic water requirements have been estimated by Peter Gleick at around 50 liters per person per day, excluding water for gardens.

Drinking water is water that is of sufficiently high quality so that it can be consumed or used without risk of immediate or long term harm. Such water is commonly called potable water. In most developed countries, the water supplied to domestic, commerce and industry is all of drinking water standard even though only a very small proportion is actually consumed or used in food preparation.

844 million people still lacked even a basic drinking water service in 2017. Of those, 159 million people worldwide drink water directly from surface water sources, such as lakes and streams. One in eight people in the world do not have access to safe water. Unsafe drinking water leads to 1.2 million deaths per year according to the World Bank.

== Challenges and threats ==
=== Water scarcity ===
Water scarcity (closely related to water stress or water crisis) is the lack of any, local or economically viably transportable, sources of fresh water resources to meet the standard water demand in a region. There are two types of water scarcity. One is physical. The other is economic water scarcity. Physical water scarcity is where there is not enough water to meet all demands. This includes water needed for ecosystems to function. Regions with a desert climate often face physical water scarcity. Central Asia, West Asia, North Africa, and most of Australia are examples of arid areas. Economic water scarcity results from a lack of investment in infrastructure or technology to draw usable water from rivers, aquifers, and other water sources. It also results from weak human capacity to meet water demand. Many people in sub-Saharan Africa are living with economic water scarcity.

=== Water pollution ===
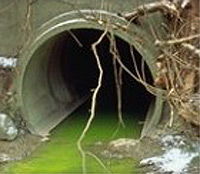
Polluted water

Water pollution (or aquatic pollution) is the contamination of water bodies, which has a negative impact on how they can be used. It is usually caused by human activities. Water bodies include lakes, rivers, oceans, aquifers, reservoirs and groundwater. Water pollution results when contaminants mix with these water bodies. Contaminants can come from one of four main sources. These are sewage discharges, industrial activities, agricultural activities, and urban runoff including stormwater. Water pollution may affect either surface water or groundwater. This form of pollution can lead to many problems. One is the degradation of aquatic ecosystems. Another is spreading water-borne diseases when people use polluted water for drinking or irrigation. Water pollution also reduces the ecosystem services such as drinking water provided by the water resource.

=== Water conflict ===
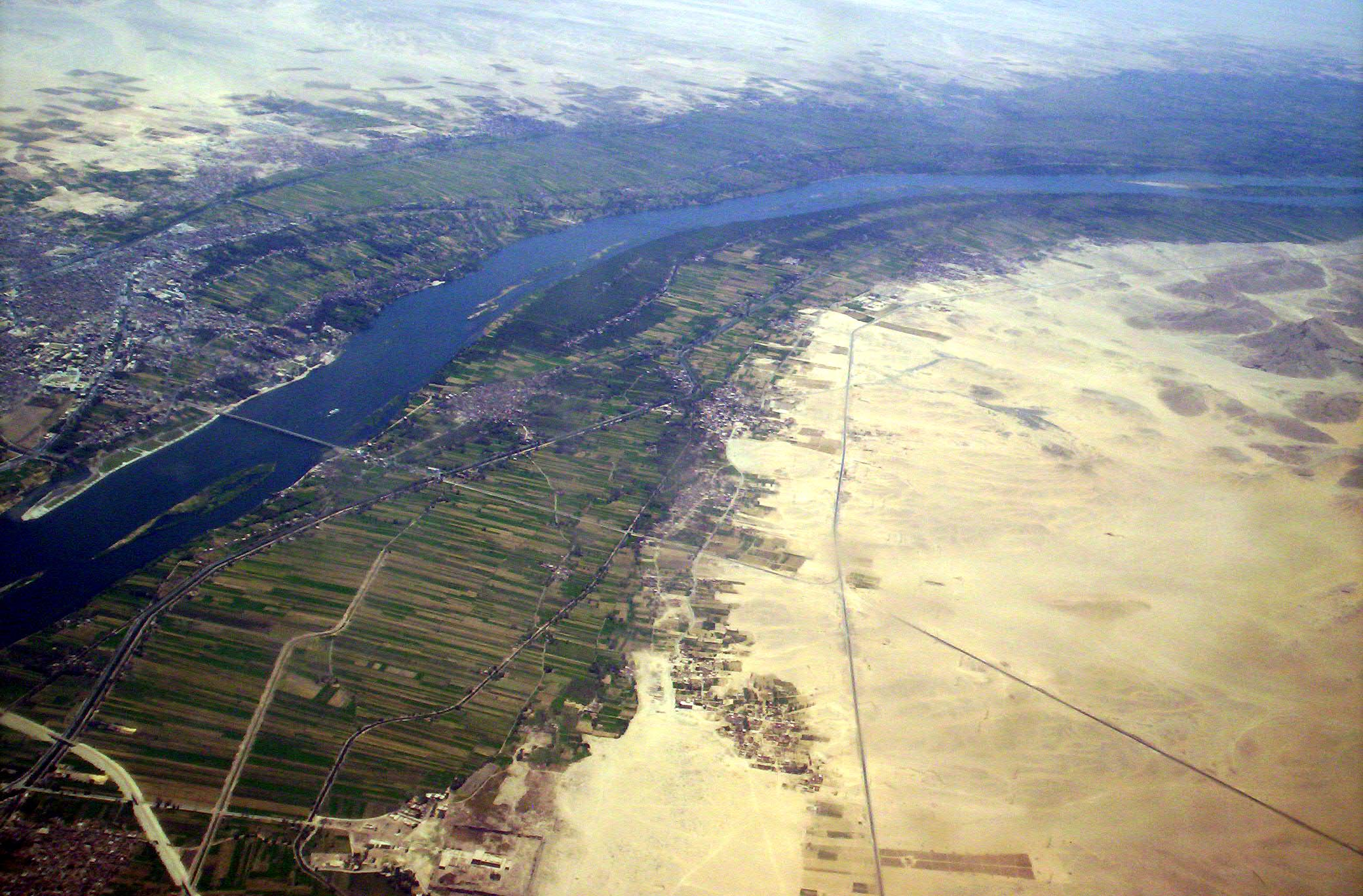
Ethiopia's move to fill the GERD dam's reservoir could reduce Nile flows by as much as 25% and devastate Egyptian farmlands.

Water conflict typically refers to violence or disputes associated with access to, or control of, water resources, or the use of water or water systems as weapons or casualties of conflicts. The term water war is colloquially used in media for some disputes over water, and often is more limited to describing a conflict between countries, states, or groups over the rights to access water resources. The United Nations recognizes that water disputes result from opposing interests of water users, public or private. A wide range of water conflicts appear throughout history, though they are rarely traditional wars waged over water alone. Instead, water has long been a source of tension and one of the causes for conflicts. Water conflicts arise for several reasons, including territorial disputes, a fight for resources, and strategic advantage.

=== Climate change ===
Impacts of climate change that are tied to water, affect people's water security on a daily basis. They include more frequent and intense heavy precipitation which affects the frequency, size and timing of floods. Also droughts can alter the total amount of freshwater and cause a decline in groundwater storage, and reduction in groundwater recharge. Reduction in water quality due to extreme events can also occur.^{: 558} Faster melting of glaciers can also occur.

=== Groundwater overdrafting ===
The world's supply of groundwater is steadily decreasing. Groundwater depletion (or overdrafting) is occurring for example in Asia, South America and North America. It is still unclear how much natural renewal balances this usage, and whether ecosystems are threatened.

Within a long period of groundwater depletion in California's Central Valley, short periods of recovery were mostly driven by extreme weather events that typically caused flooding and had negative social, environmental and economic consequences.

Groundwater depletion or groundwater overdrafting is the process of extracting groundwater beyond the equilibrium yield of an aquifer. Groundwater is one of the largest sources of fresh water and is found underground. The primary cause of groundwater depletion is the excessive pumping of groundwater up from underground aquifers. Insufficient recharge can lead to depletion, reducing the usefulness of the aquifer for humans. Depletion can also have impacts on the environment around the aquifer, such as soil compression and land subsidence, local climatic change, soil chemistry changes, and other deterioration of the local environment.

== Water resource management ==
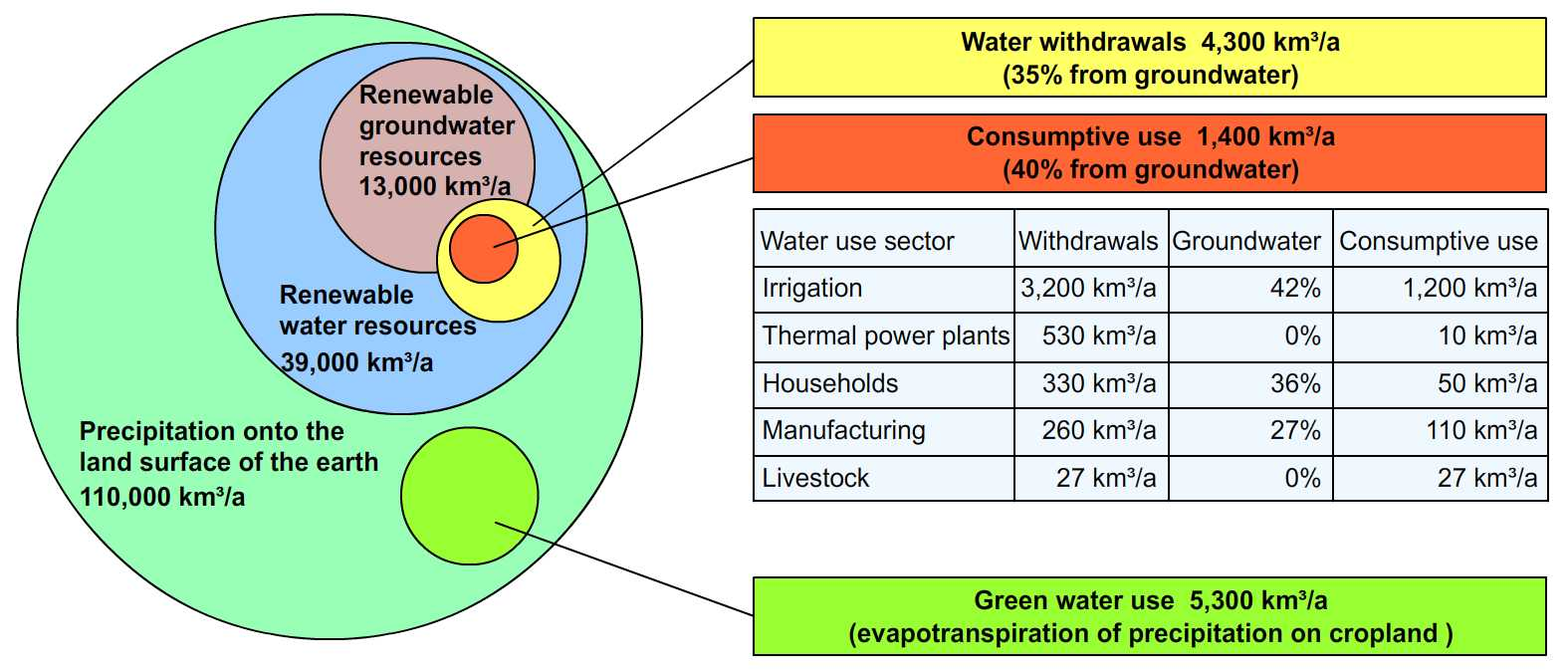
Global values of water resources and human water use (excluding Antarctica). Water resources 1961-90, water use around 2000. Computed by the global freshwater model WaterGAP.

Water resource management is the activity of planning, developing, distributing and managing the optimum use of water resources. It is an aspect of water cycle management. The field of water resources management will have to continue to adapt to the current and future issues facing the allocation of water. With the growing uncertainties of global climate change and the long-term impacts of past management actions, this decision-making will be even more difficult. It is likely that ongoing climate change will lead to situations that have not been encountered. As a result, alternative management strategies, including participatory approaches and adaptive capacity are increasingly being used to strengthen water decision-making.

Ideally, water resource management planning has regard to all the competing demands for water and seeks to allocate water on an equitable basis to satisfy all uses and demands. As with other resource management, this is rarely possible in practice so decision-makers must prioritise issues of sustainability, equity and factor optimisation (in that order!) to achieve acceptable outcomes. One of the biggest concerns for water-based resources in the future is the sustainability of the current and future water resource allocation.

Sustainable Development Goal 6 has a target related to water resources management: "Target 6.5: By 2030, implement integrated water resources management at all levels, including through transboundary cooperation as appropriate."

=== Sustainable water management ===
At present, only about 0.08 percent of all the world's fresh water is accessible. And there is ever-increasing demand for drinking, manufacturing, leisure and agriculture. Due to the small percentage of water available, optimizing the fresh water we have left from natural resources has been a growing challenge around the world.

Much effort in water resource management is directed at optimizing the use of water and in minimizing the environmental impact of water use on the natural environment. The observation of water as an integral part of the ecosystem is based on integrated water resources management, based on the 1992 Dublin Principles (see below).

Sustainable water management requires a holistic approach based on the principles of Integrated Water Resource Management, originally articulated in 1992 at the Dublin (January) and Rio (July) conferences. The four Dublin Principles, promulgated in the Dublin Statement are:

1. Fresh water is a finite and vulnerable resource, essential to sustain life, development and the environment;
2. Water development and management should be based on a participatory approach, involving users, planners and policy-makers at all levels;
3. Women play a central part in the provision, management and safeguarding of water;
4. Water has an economic value in all its competing uses and should be recognized as an economic good.

Implementation of these principles has guided reform of national water management law around the world since 1992.

Further challenges to sustainable and equitable water resources management include the fact that many water bodies are shared across boundaries which may be international (see water conflict) or intra-national (see Murray-Darling basin).

=== Integrated water resources management ===
Integrated water resources management (IWRM) has been defined by the Global Water Partnership (GWP) as "a process which promotes the coordinated development and management of water, land and related resources, in order to maximize the resultant economic and social welfare in an equitable manner without compromising the sustainability of vital ecosystems".

Some scholars say that IWRM is complementary to water security because water security is a goal or destination, whilst IWRM is the process necessary to achieve that goal.

IWRM is a paradigm that emerged at international conferences in the late 1900s and early 2000s, although participatory water management institutions have existed for centuries. Discussions on a holistic way of managing water resources began already in the 1950s leading up to the 1977 United Nations Water Conference. The development of IWRM was particularly recommended in the final statement of the ministers at the International Conference on Water and the Environment in 1992, known as the Dublin Statement. This concept aims to promote changes in practices which are considered fundamental to improved water resource management. IWRM was a topic of the second World Water Forum, which was attended by a more varied group of stakeholders than the preceding conferences and contributed to the creation of the GWP.

In the International Water Association definition, IWRM rests upon three principles that together act as the overall framework:

1. Social equity: ensuring equal access for all users (particularly marginalized and poorer user groups) to an adequate quantity and quality of water necessary to sustain human well-being.
2. Economic efficiency: bringing the greatest benefit to the greatest number of users possible with the available financial and water resources.
3. Ecological sustainability: requiring that aquatic ecosystems are acknowledged as users and that adequate allocation is made to sustain their natural functioning.

In 2002, the development of IWRM was discussed at the World Summit on Sustainable Development held in Johannesburg, which aimed to encourage the implementation of IWRM at a global level. The third World Water Forum recommended IWRM and discussed information sharing, stakeholder participation, and gender and class dynamics.

Operationally, IWRM approaches involve applying knowledge from various disciplines as well as the insights from diverse stakeholders to devise and implement efficient, equitable and sustainable solutions to water and development problems. As such, IWRM is a comprehensive, participatory planning and implementation tool for managing and developing water resources in a way that balances social and economic needs, and that ensures the protection of ecosystems for future generations. In addition, in light of contributing the achievement of Sustainable Development goals (SDGs), IWRM has been evolving into more sustainable approach as it considers the Nexus approach, which is a cross-sectoral water resource management. The Nexus approach is based on the recognition that "water, energy and food are closely linked through global and local water, carbon and energy cycles or chains."

An IWRM approach aims at avoiding a fragmented approach of water resources management by considering the following aspects: Enabling environment, roles of Institutions, management Instruments. Some of the cross-cutting conditions that are also important to consider when implementing IWRM are: Political will and commitment, capacity development, adequate investment, financial stability and sustainable cost recovery, monitoring and evaluation. There is not one correct administrative model. The art of IWRM lies in selecting, adjusting and applying the right mix of these tools for a given situation. IWRM practices depend on context; at the operational level, the challenge is to translate the agreed principles into concrete action.

=== Managing water in urban settings ===
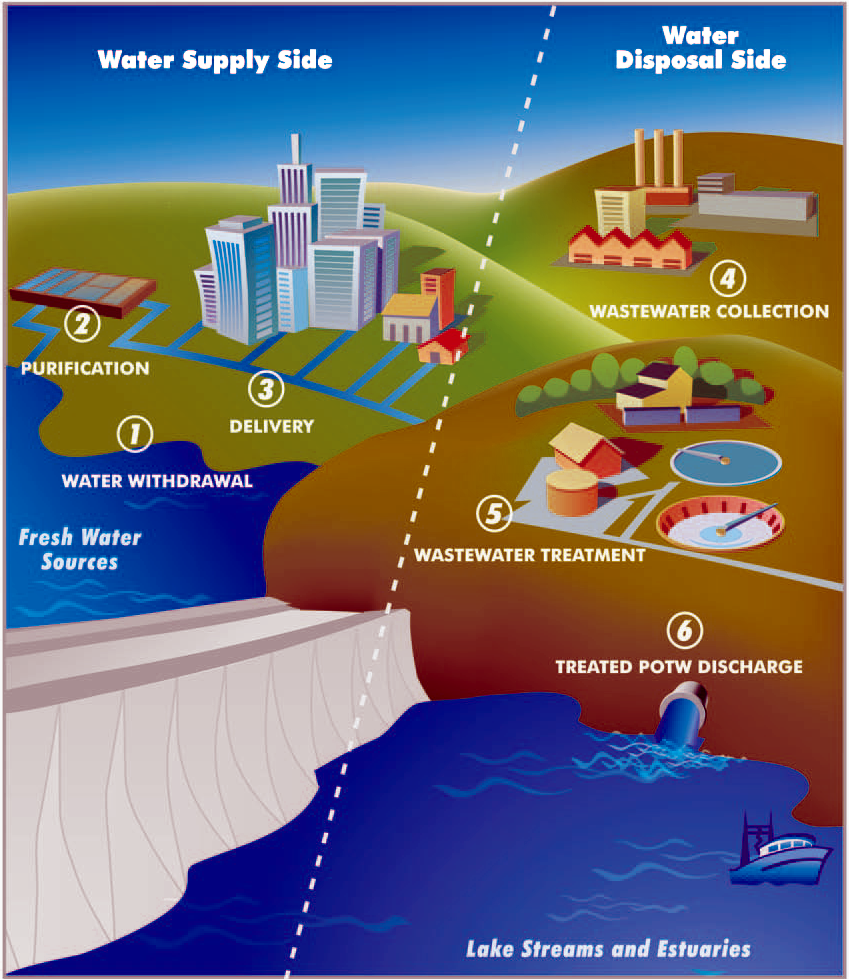
Typical urban water cycle depicting drinking water purification and municipal sewage treatment systems

Integrated urban water management (IUWM) is the practice of managing freshwater, wastewater, and storm water as components of a basin-wide management plan. It builds on existing water supply and sanitation considerations within an urban settlement by incorporating urban water management within the scope of the entire river basin. IUWM is commonly seen as a strategy for achieving the goals of Water Sensitive Urban Design. IUWM seeks to change the impact of urban development on the natural water cycle, based on the premise that by managing the urban water cycle as a whole; a more efficient use of resources can be achieved providing not only economic benefits but also improved social and environmental outcomes. One approach is to establish an inner, urban, water cycle loop through the implementation of reuse strategies. Developing this urban water cycle loop requires an understanding both of the natural, pre-development, water balance and the post-development water balance. Accounting for flows in the pre- and post-development systems is an important step toward limiting urban impacts on the natural water cycle.

IUWM within an urban water system can also be conducted by performance assessment of any new intervention strategies by developing a holistic approach which encompasses various system elements and criteria including sustainability type ones in which integration of water system components including water supply, waste water and storm water subsystems would be advantageous. Simulation of metabolism type flows in urban water system can also be useful for analysing processes in urban water cycle of IUWM.

== By country ==
Water resource management and governance is handled differently by different countries. For example, in the United States, the United States Geological Survey (USGS) and its partners monitor water resources, conduct research and inform the public about groundwater quality. Water resources in specific countries are described below:

== See also ==
- List of sovereign states by freshwater withdrawal
- List of countries by total renewable water resources
- Socio-hydrology – Interdisciplinary field studying the dynamic interactions between water and people
- Virtual water – Concept on hidden water in traded commodities
- Water resources law – Law and regulations that relate to water resources
- Water rights – Right of a user to use water from a water source
- Water storage – Storage of water by various means
