= Gas networks simulation =

Gas pipeline

Gas networks simulation or gas pipeline simulation is a process of defining the mathematical model of gas transmission and gas distribution systems, which are usually composed of highly integrated pipe networks operating over a wide range of pressures. Simulation allows to predict the behaviour of gas network systems under different conditions. Such predictions can be effectively used to guide decisions regarding the design and operation of the real system.

== Simulation types ==
Depending on the gas flow characteristics in the system there are two states that can be matter of simulation:

- Steady state – the simulation does not take into account the gas flow characteristics' variations over time and described by the system of algebraic equations, in general nonlinear ones.
- Unsteady state (transient flow analysis) – described either by a partial differential equation or a system of such equations. Gas flow characteristics are mainly functions of time.

== Network topology ==
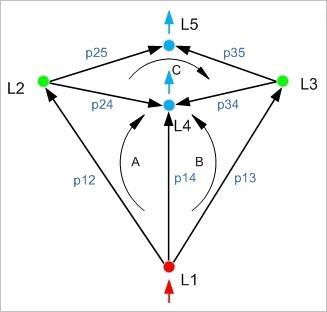
Gas Network Topology

In the gas networks simulation and analysis, matrices turned out to be the natural way of expressing the problem. Any network can be described by set of matrices based on the network topology. Consider the gas network by the graph below. The network consists of one source node (reference node) L1, four load nodes (2, 3, 4 and 5) and seven pipes or branches. For network analysis it is necessary to select at least one reference node. Mathematically, the reference node is referred to as the independent node and all nodal and branch quantities are dependent on it. The pressure at source node is usually known, and this node is often used as the reference node. However, any node in the network may have its pressure defined and can be used as the reference node. A network may contain several sources or other pressure-defined nodes and these form a set of reference nodes for the network.
The load nodes are points in the network where load values are known. These loads may be positive, negative or zero. A negative load represents a demand for gas from the network. This may consist in supplying domestic or commercial consumers, filling gas storage holders, or even accounting for leakage in the network. A positive load represents a supply of gas to the network. This may consist in taking gas from storage, source or from another network. A zero load is placed on nodes that do not have a load but are used to represent a point of change in the network topology, such as the junction of several branches. For steady state conditions, the total load on the network is balanced by the inflow into the network at the source node.
The interconnection of a network can produce a closed path of branches, known as a loop. In figure, loop A consists of branches p12-p24-p14, loop B consists of p13-p34-p14, and loop C consists of p24-p25-p35-p34. A fourth loop may be defined as p12-p24-p34-p13, but it is redundant if loops A, B and C are also defined. Loops A, B and C are independent ones but the fourth one is not, as it can be derived from A, B and C by eliminating common branches.
To define the network topology completely it is necessary to assign a direction to each branch. Each branch direction is assigned arbitrarily and is assumed to be positive direction of flow in the branch. If the flow has the negative value, then the direction of flow is opposite to branch direction. In the similar way, direction is assigned to each loop and flow in the loop.
The solutions of problems involving gas network computation of any topology requires such a representation of the network to be found which enables the calculations to be performed in the most simple way. These requirements are met by the graph theory which permits representation of the network structure by means of the incidence properties of the network components and, in consequence, makes such a representation explicit.

== Flow equations ==
The calculation of the pressure drop along the individual pipes of a gas network requires use of the flow equations. Multiple gas flow equations have been developed and a number have been used by the gas industry. Most are based on the result of gas flow experiments. The result of the particular formula normally varies because these experiments were conducted over different range of flow conditions, and on varying internal surface roughness. Instead, each formula is applicable to a limited range of flow and pipe surface conditions.

== Mathematical methods of simulation ==
=== Steady state analysis ===
A gas network is in the steady state when the values of gas flow characteristics are independent of time and system described by the set of nonlinear equations. The goal of simple simulation of a gas network is usually that of computing the values of nodes' pressures, loads and the values of flows in the individual pipes. The pressures at the nodes and the flow rates in the pipes must satisfy the flow equations, and together with nodes' loads must fulfill Kirchhoff's laws for junctions and loops.

There are a number of methods of analyzing the mathematical models of gas networks but they can be divided into two types as the networks, the solvers for low pressure networks and solvers for high pressure networks.
The networks equations are nonlinear and are generally solved by some of Newton iteration; rather than use the full set of variables it is possible to eliminate some of them. Based on the type of elimination we can get solution techniques are termed either nodal or loop methods.

==== Newton-nodal method ====
The method is based on the set of the nodal equations which are simply mathematical representation of Kirchhoff's first law which states that the inlet and outlet flow at each node should be equal. Initial approximation is made to the nodal pressures. The approximation is then successively corrected until the final solution is reached.

===== Disadvantages =====
- Poor convergence characteristics, the method is extremely sensitive to initial conditions.

===== Advantages =====
- Does not require extra computation to produce and optimize a set of loops.
- Can easily be adapted for optimization tasks.

==== Newton-loop method ====
The method is based on the generated loops and the equations are simply mathematical representation of Kirchhoff's second law which states that the sum of the pressure-drops around any loop should be zero. Before using loops method the fundamental set of loops need to be found. Basically the fundamental set of loops can be found by constructing spanning tree for the network. The standard methods for producing spanning tree is based on a breadth-first search or on a depth-first search which are not so efficient for large networks, because the computing time of these methods is proportional to n^{2}, where n is the number of pipes in the network. More efficient method for large networks is the forest method and its computational time is proportional to n*log_{2}n.

The loops that are produced from the spanning tree are not the best set that could be produced. There is often significant overlap between loops with some pipes shared between several loops. This usually slows convergence, therefore the loops' reduction algorithm needs to be applied to minimize the loops overlapping. This is usually performed by replacing the loops in the original fundamental set by smaller loops produced by linear combination of the original set.

===== Disadvantages =====
- It requires extra computation to produce and optimize a set of loops.
- The dimension of the equations to be solved is smaller but they are much less sparse.

===== Advantages =====
- The main advantage is that the equation can be solved efficiently with an iterative method that avoids the need of matrix factorization and consequently has a minimal requirement for storage; this makes it attractive for low pressure networks with a large number of pipes.
- Fast convergence which is less sensitive to the initial conditions.

==== Newton loop-node method ====
The Newton loop-node method is based on Kirchhoff’s first and second laws. The Newton loop-node method is the combination of the Newton nodal and loop methods and does not solve loop equations explicitly. The loop equations are transformed to an equivalent set of nodal equations, which are then solved to yield the nodal pressures. The nodal pressures are used then to calculate the corrections to the chord flows (which is synonymous to loop flows), and the tree branch flows are obtained from them.

===== Disadvantages =====
- Since set of nodal equations are solved nodal Jacobi matrix is used which is more sparse then the equivalent loop Jacobi matrix which may have negative impact on computational efficiency and usability.

===== Advantages =====
- Good convergence characteristics of loop method are maintained.
- No need to define and optimize the loops.

== Computer simulation ==
The importance of the mathematical methods' efficiency arises from the large scale of simulated network. It is required that the computation costs of the simulation method be low, this is related to the computation time and computer storage. At the same time the accuracy of the computed values must acceptable for the particular model.
