= Dublin Statement =

The Dublin Statement on Water and Sustainable Development, also known as the Dublin Principles, was a meeting of experts on water related problems that took place on 31 January 1992 at the International Conference on Water and the Environment (ICWE), Dublin, Ireland, organised on 26–31 January 1992.

The Dublin Statement on Water and Sustainable Development recognises the increasing scarcity of water as a result of the different conflicting uses and overuses of water.

== The Dublin Principles ==
The declaration sets out recommendations for action at local, national and international levels to reduce the scarcity, through the following four guiding principles:

1. Fresh water is a finite and vulnerable resource, essential to sustain life, development and the environment
2. Water development and management should be based on a participatory approach, involving users, planners and policy-makers at all levels
3. Women play a central part in the provision, management and safeguarding of water
4. Water has an economic value in all its competing uses and should be recognized as an economic good

== Water as a human right or economic good? ==
The emphasis of the Dublin Statement on the economic value of water rather than water as a universal right is highly contested by NGOs and human rights activists (although the full text of principle 4 does state it is vital to recognize first the basic right of all human beings to have access to clean water and sanitation at an affordable price)

In November 2002, however, the UN Committee on Economic, Social and Cultural Rights adopted General Comment No. 15, which was formulated by experts as a comment on articles 11 and 12 of the International Covenant on Economic, Social and Cultural Rights. In this comment, water is recognised not only as a limited natural resource and a public good but also as a human right. This step - adopting General Comment No. 15 - was seen as a decisive step towards the recognition of water as universal right.

On 30 September 2010, the 15th Session of the UN Human Rights Council passed Resolution A/HRC/15/L.14, reaffirming an earlier General Assembly resolution (64/292 of 28 July 2010) which recognized the right to safe and clean drinking water and sanitation as a human right that is essential for the full enjoyment of life and all human rights. Resolution A/HRC/15/L.14 clarifies that the human right to safe drinking water and sanitation is derived from the right to an adequate standard of living and inextricably related to the right to the highest attainable standard of physical and mental health, as well as the right to life and human dignity.

== See also ==
- Integrated Water Resources Management
- Global Water Partnership
- Right to water
- Water scarcity
- WASH - Water, sanitation, hygiene
