= WaterGAP =

Global freshwater model

The global freshwater model WaterGAP calculates flows and storages of water on all continents of the globe (except Antarctica), taking into account the human influence on the natural freshwater system by water abstractions and dams. It supports understanding the freshwater situation across the world's river basins during the 20th and the 21st centuries, and is applied to assess water scarcity, droughts and floods and to quantify the impact of human actions on e.g. groundwater, wetlands, streamflow and sea-level rise. Modelling results of WaterGAP have contributed to international assessment of the global environmental situation including the UN World Water Development Reports, the Millennium Ecosystem Assessment, the UN Global Environmental Outlooks as well as to reports of the Intergovernmental Panel on Climate Change. WaterGAP contributes to the Intersectoral Impact Model Intercomparison Project ISIMIP, where consistent ensembles of model runs by a number of global hydrological models are generated to assess the impact of climate change and other anthropogenic stressors on freshwater resources world-wide.

WaterGAP (Water Global Assessment and Prognosis) was developed at the University of Kassel (Germany) since 1996, while later on development has continued at Goethe University Frankfurt and Ruhr University Bochum. It consists of both the WaterGAP Global Hydrology Model (WGHM) and five water use models for the sectors irrigation, livestock, households, manufacturing and cooling of thermal power plants. An additional model component computes the fractions of total water use that are abstracted from either groundwater or surface waters (rivers, lakes and reservoirs). The model runs with a temporal resolution of 1 day; WaterGAP 2 has a spatial resolution of 0.5 degree geographical latitude × 0.5 degree geographical longitude (equivalent to 55 km × 55 km at the equator) and WaterGAP 3 a spatial resolution of 5 arc minutes x 5 arc minutes (9 km x 9 km). Model input includes time series of climate data (e.g. precipitation, temperature and radiation) and information such as characteristics of surface water bodies (lakes, reservoirs and wetlands), land cover, soil type, topography and irrigated area.

== WaterGAP Global Hydrology Model WGHM ==
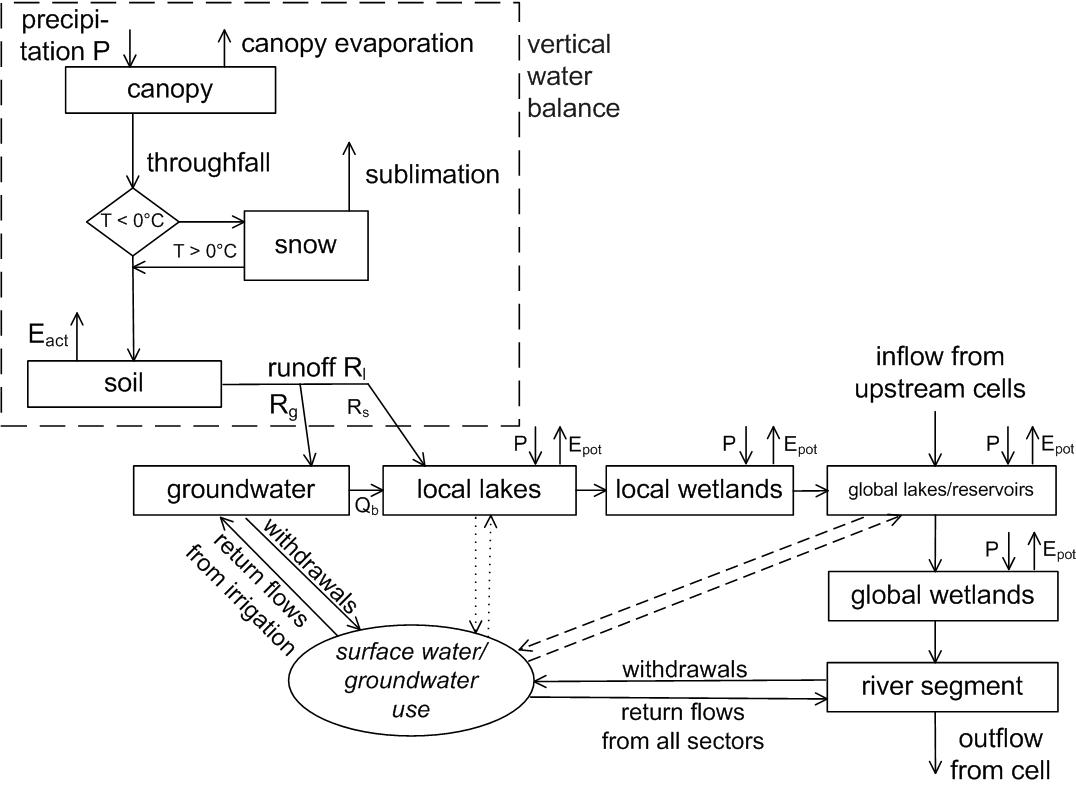
Water storages (boxes) and flows (arrows) modelled for each grid cell of WGHM

WGHM computes time-series of fast-surface and subsurface runoff, groundwater recharge and river discharge as well as storage variations of water in canopy, snow, soil, groundwater, lakes, wetlands and rivers. Thus, it quantifies the total renewable water resources as well as the renewable groundwater resources of a grid cell, river basin, or country. Precipitation on each grid cell is transported through the different storage compartments, where water can also evapotranspirate. Location and size of wetlands, lakes and reservoirs are defined by the global lakes and wetland database (GLWD), and the GRanD database of man-made reservoirs. Groundwater storage is affected by diffuse groundwater recharge through the soil and by point recharge from surface water bodies. Diffuse groundwater recharge is modeled as a function of total runoff, relief, soil texture, hydrogeology and the existence of permafrost or glaciers. Cell runoff is routed downstream until it reaches the ocean or an internal sink. To allow a plausible representation of the actual freshwater situation, version 2.2d of WGHM is tuned against observed long-term mean annual streamflow at 1319 gauging stations. Performance of WGHM with respect to streamflow observations has been compared in various studies to that of other global hydrological models for both Europe and the globe, while performance with respect to GRACE total water storage anomaly was compared globally and for U.S. aquifers.

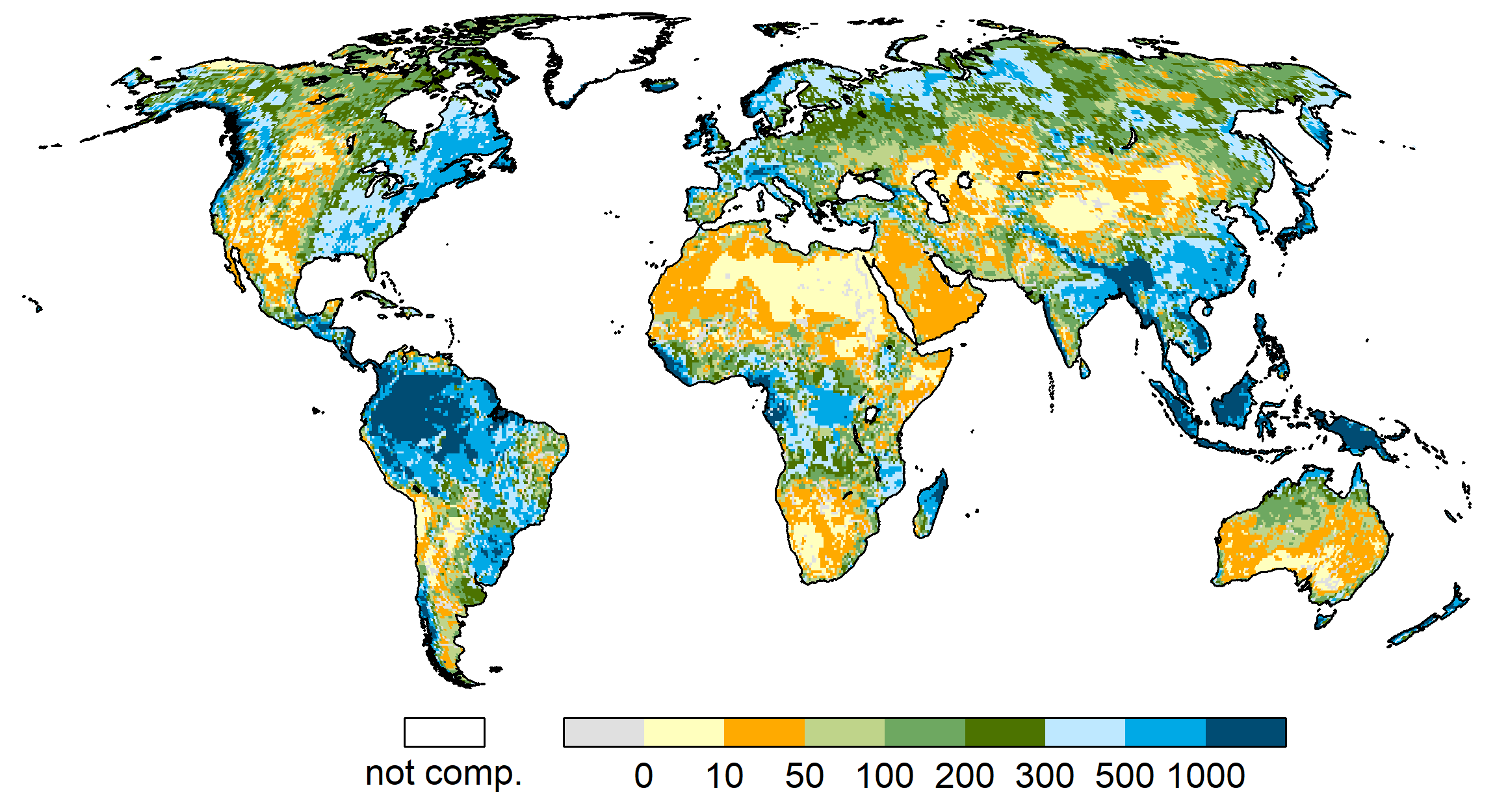
Total renewable water resources, in mm/yr (1 mm is equivalent to 1 L of water per m2) (average 1981-2010).

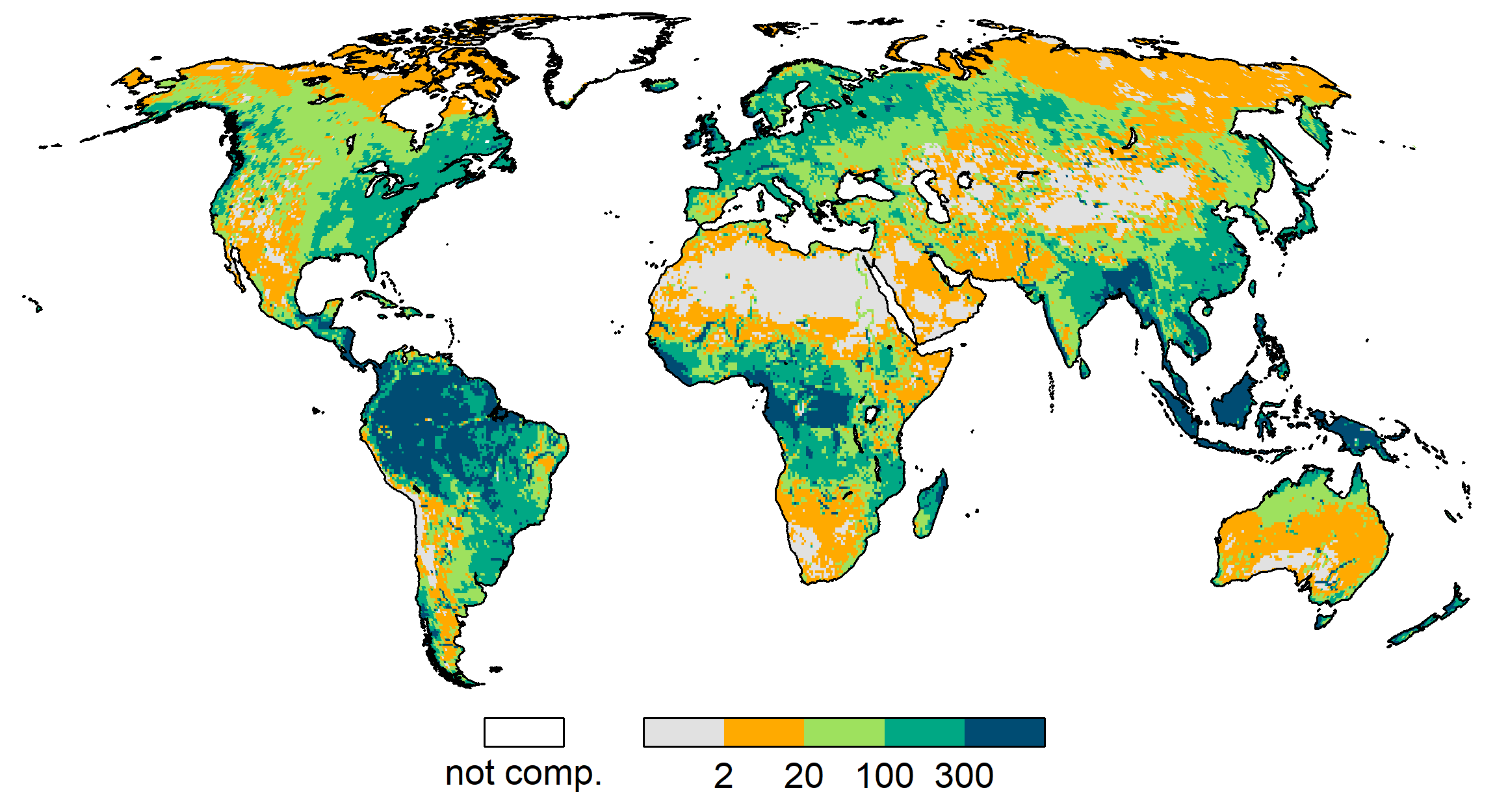
Total renewable groundwater resources, in mm/yr (1 mm is equivalent to 1 L of water per m2) (average 1981-2010), which are a part of the total renewable freshwater resources and the maximum that can be abstracted without depleting the groundwater.

== Water Use Models ==
In WaterGAP, modeling of water use refers to computation of water withdrawals (abstractions) from either groundwater or surface water bodies (lakes, reservoirs and rivers), of consumptive water uses (the fraction of the abstracted water that evapotranspires during use) and of the return flows to groundwater or surface water bodies. Consumptive irrigation water use is computed by the Global Irrigation Model as a function of irrigated area and climate in each grid cell. Livestock water use is calculated as a function of the animal numbers and water requirements of different livestock types. Domestic and manufacturing use are based on national values of water withdrawals at different points in time. The temporal development of national household water use is based on statistical data modeled as a function of technological and structural change (the latter as a function of gross domestic product), taking into account population change. The temporal development of manufacturing water use takes into account technological change and the development of manufacturing gross value added. National values of domestic and manufacturing water use are downscaled to the grid cells using population density and urban population density, respectively. Water use for cooling of thermal power plants takes into account the location and characteristics of thermal power plants. Time series of monthly values of irrigation water use are computed, while all other uses are assumed to be constant throughout the year and to only vary from year to year. Based on sectoral water withdrawals and consumptive use as computed by the five water use models, the model component GWSWUSE calculates surface water abstractions from and return flows to groundwater and surface water as well as the total net abstraction from groundwater and from surface water in each grid cell.

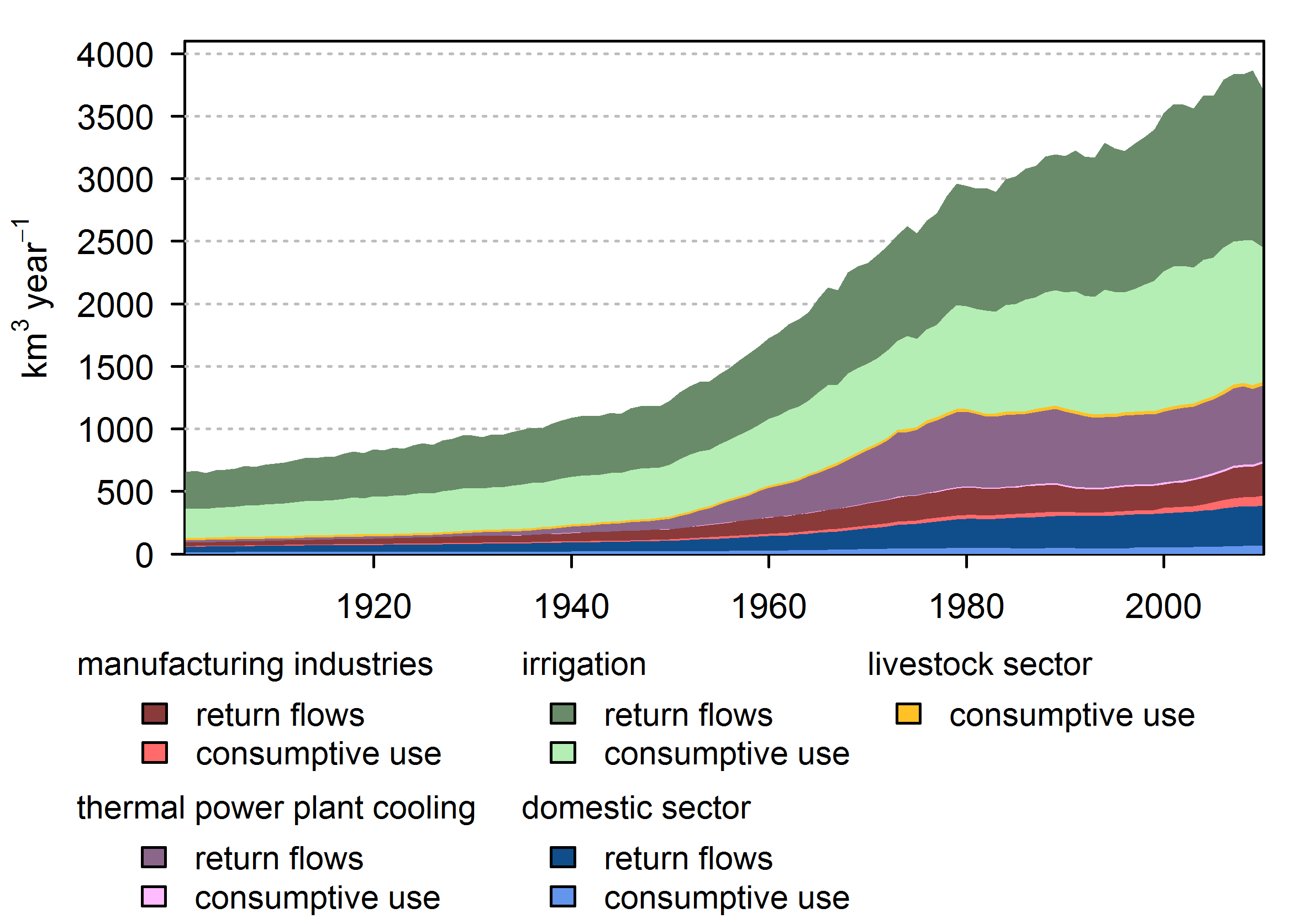
Development of water abstractions (sum of return flows and consumptive use) and water consumption (the amount of water that is evapotranspired or incorporated in products, light colours) of the five water use sectors considered in WaterGAP for 1901–2010

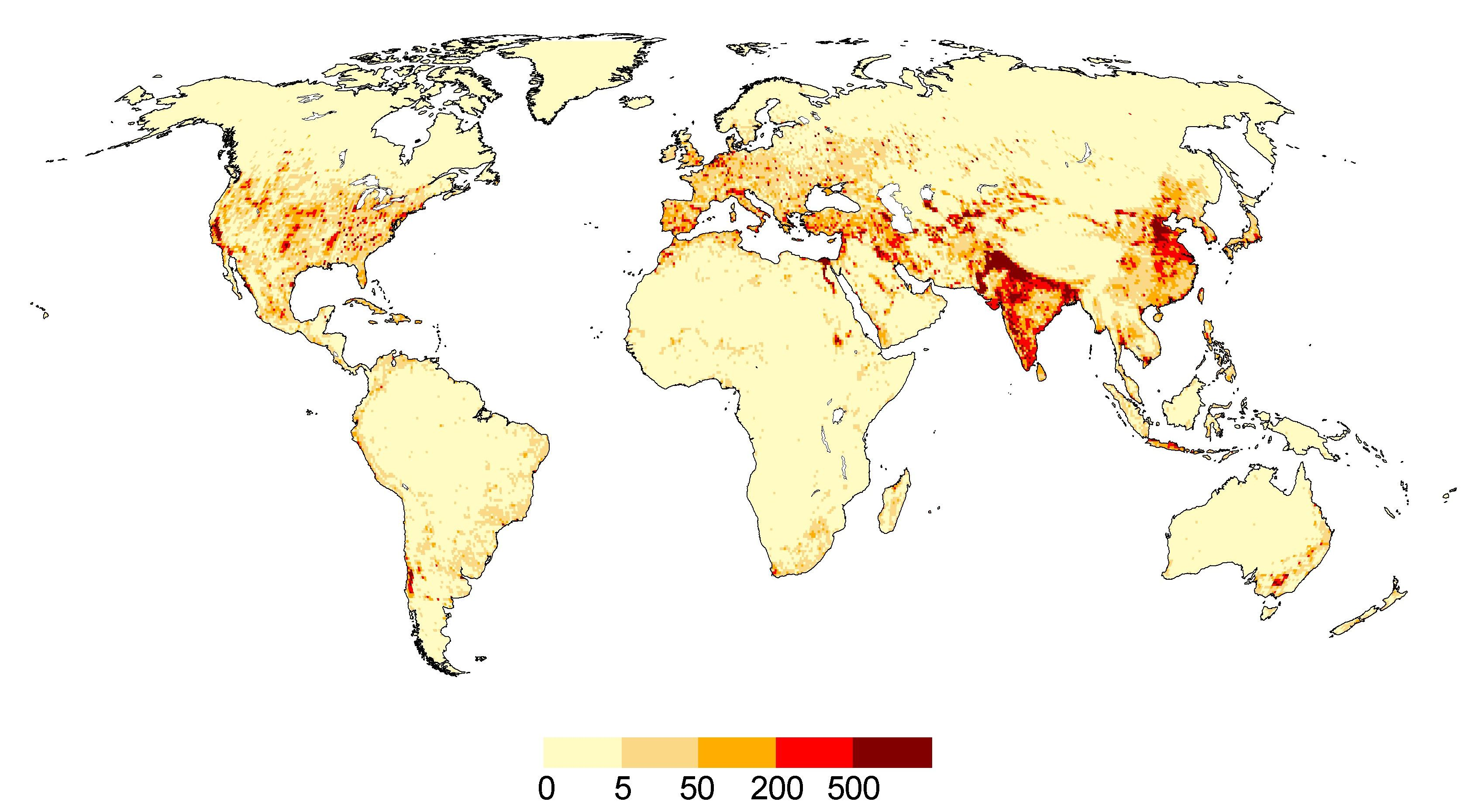
Water withdrawals around the year 2000, in mm/yr.

== Applications ==
WaterGAP has been applied to assess which areas of the world are and will be affected by water stress, and to estimate the world's freshwater balance. In many studies, WaterGAP served to estimate the impact of climate change on the global freshwater system, e.g. on groundwater, wetlands, streamflow and irrigation requirements. Groundwater stress and depletion of groundwater resources were analyzed. In addition, the alteration of ecologically relevant river flow characteristics and wetland dynamics due to human water use and dams was studied. Time series of WaterGAP total water storage anomalies were used to process and interpret GRACE (Gravity Recovery and Climate Experiment) satellite measurement of the dynamic gravity of the Earth, as for the continents, the seasonal and longer-term gravity changes are to a large extent caused by changes of the water stored in groundwater, surface waters, soil and snow. These time series also served to estimate the contribution of water storage variations on the continents to sea level rise. WaterGAP results are also used in life-cycle assessments to take into account water stress at production sites.

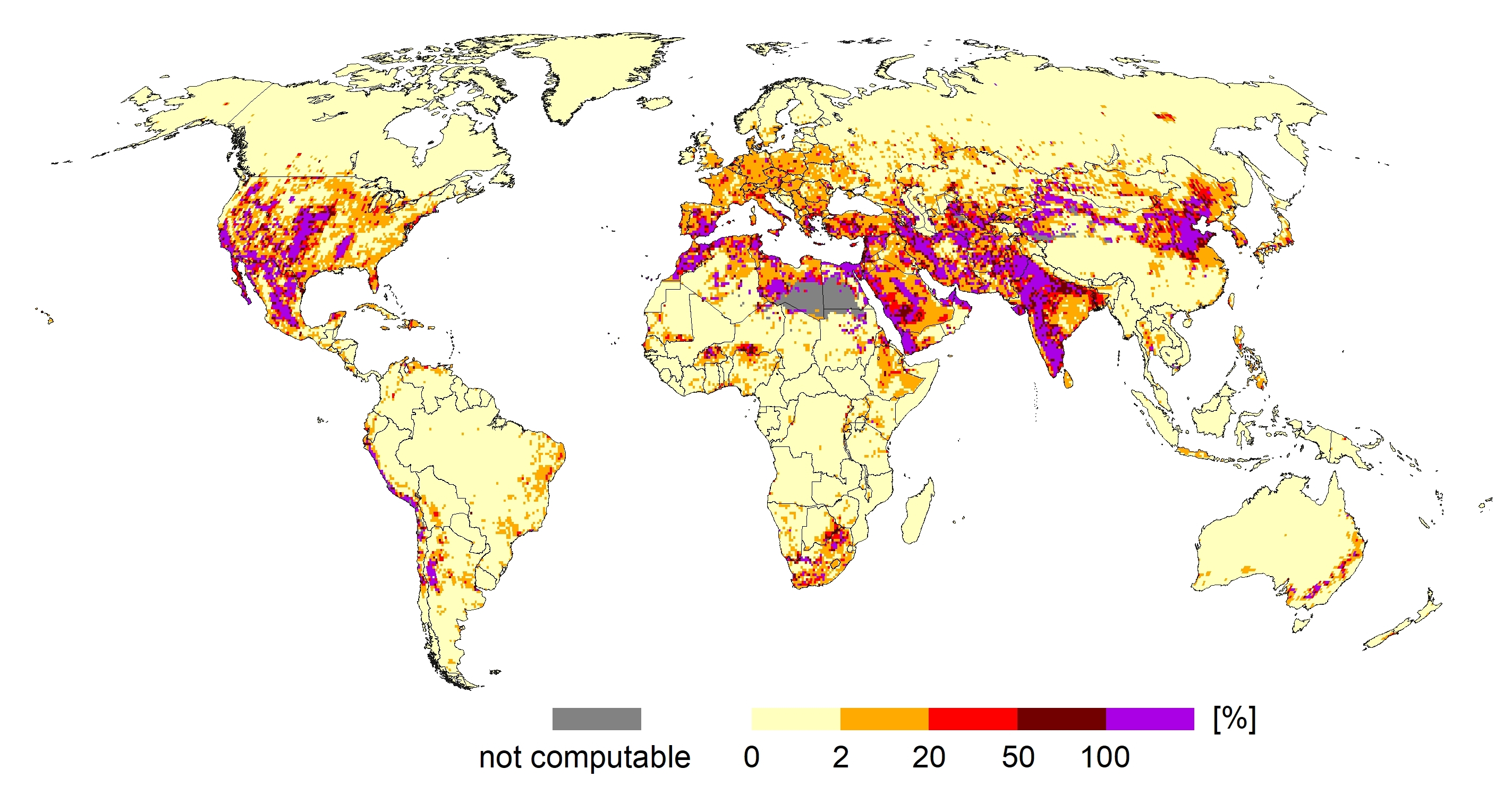
Groundwater stress: Groundwater withdrawals in 2010 in percent of renewable groundwater resources. Purple regions are likely to suffer from groundwater depletion, with declining groundwater tables.

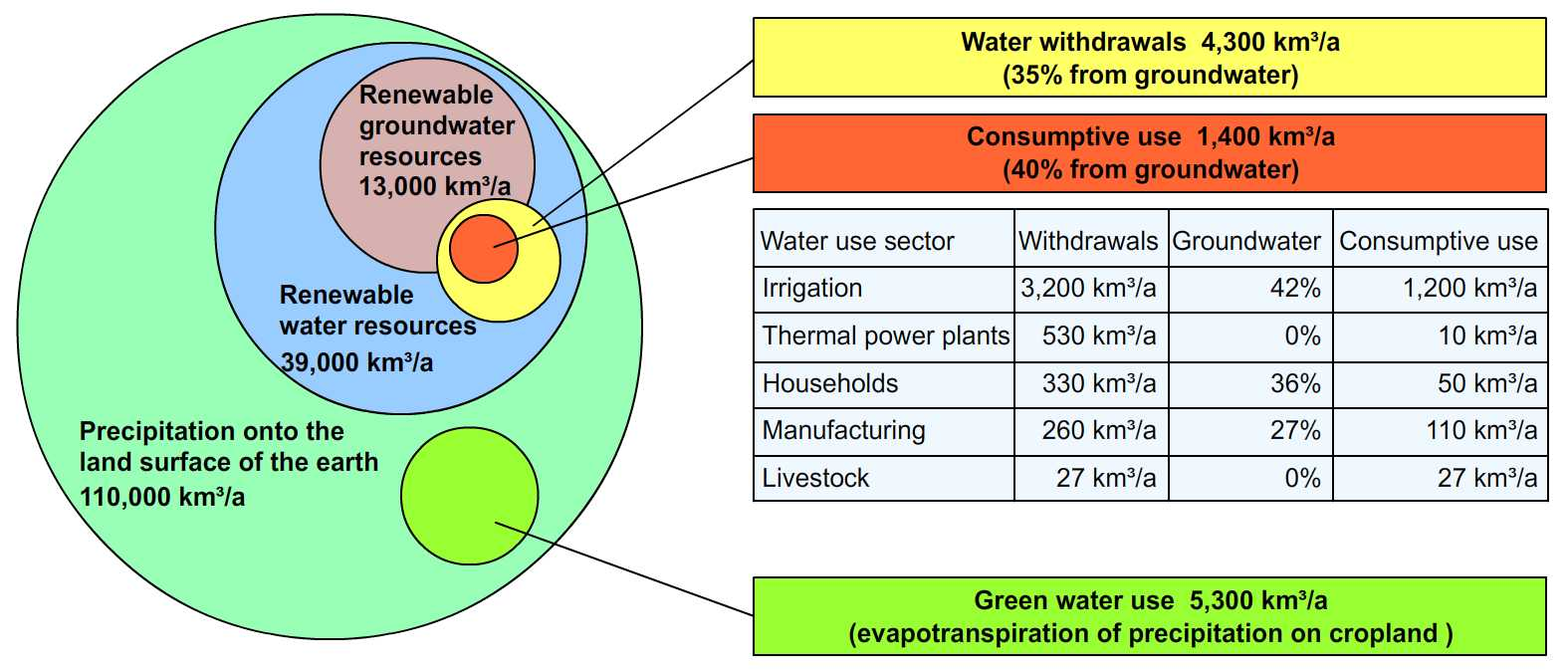
Global values of water resources and human water use (excluding Antarctica). Water resources 1961-90, water use around 2000.
