= Dimensionless numbers in fluid mechanics =

Dimensionless numbers (or characteristic numbers) have an important role in analyzing the behavior of fluids and their flow as well as in other transport phenomena. They include the Reynolds and the Mach numbers, which describe as ratios the relative magnitude of fluid and physical system characteristics, such as density, viscosity, speed of sound, and flow speed. To compare a real situation (e.g. an aircraft) with a small-scale model it is necessary to keep the important characteristic numbers the same. Names and formulation of these numbers were standardized in ISO 31-12 and in ISO 80000-11.

== Diffusive numbers in transport phenomena ==
Dimensionless numbers in transport phenomena
| vs. | Inertial | Viscous | Thermal | Mass |
|---|---|---|---|---|
| Inertial | vd | Re | Pe | Pe_{AB} |
| Viscous | Re^{−1} | μ/ρ, ν | Pr | Sc |
| Thermal | Pe^{−1} | Pr^{−1} | α | Le |
| Mass | Pe_{AB}^{−1} | Sc^{−1} | Le^{−1} | D |

As a general example of how dimensionless numbers arise in fluid mechanics, the classical numbers in transport phenomena of mass, momentum, and energy are principally analyzed by the ratio of effective diffusivities in each transport mechanism. The six dimensionless numbers give the relative strengths of the different phenomena of inertia, viscosity, conductive heat transport, and diffusive mass transport. (In the table, the diagonals give common symbols for the quantities, and the given dimensionless number is the ratio of the left column quantity over top row quantity; e.g. Re = inertial force/viscous force = vd/ν.) These same quantities may alternatively be expressed as ratios of characteristic time, length, or energy scales. Such forms are less commonly used in practice, but can provide insight into particular applications.

== Droplet formation ==
Dimensionless numbers in droplet formation
| vs. | Momentum | Viscosity | Surface tension | Gravity | Kinetic energy |
|---|---|---|---|---|---|
| Momentum | ρvd | Re | | Fr | |
| Viscosity | Re^{−1} | ρν, μ | Oh, Ca, La^{−1} | Ga^{−1} | |
| Surface tension | | Oh^{−1}, Ca^{−1}, La | σ | Je | We^{−1} |
| Gravity | Fr^{−1} | Ga | Bo | g | |
| Kinetic energy | | | We | | ρv^{2}d |

Droplet formation mostly depends on momentum, viscosity and surface tension. In inkjet printing for example, an ink with a too high Ohnesorge number would not jet properly, and an ink with a too low Ohnesorge number would be jetted with many satellite drops. These dimensionless ratios can be obtained by relating each term in a consistent form, such as energy per volume or pressure. For example, the ratios of characteristic pressures (or energies per volume) for inertial, viscous, gravity, and surface tension effects gives dimensionless ratios of each pair. More fundamentally, these and other dimensionless numbers are derived from dimensional analysis and/or non-dimensionalization of the Navier-Stokes equations. Not all of the quantity ratios are explicitly named, though each of the unnamed ratios could be expressed as a product of two other named dimensionless numbers.

== List ==
All numbers are dimensionless quantities. See other article for extensive list of dimensionless quantities. Certain dimensionless quantities of some importance to fluid mechanics are given below:

| Name | Standard symbol | Definition | Named after | Field of application |
|---|---|---|---|---|
| Archimedes number | Ar | $\mathrm{Ar} = \frac{g L^3 \rho_\ell (\rho - \rho_\ell)}{\mu^2}$ | Archimedes | fluid mechanics (motion of fluids due to density differences) |
| Atwood number | A | $\mathrm{A} = \frac{\rho_1 - \rho_2} {\rho_1 + \rho_2}$ | George Atwood | fluid mechanics (onset of instabilities in fluid mixtures due to density differences) |
| Bagnold number | Ba | $\mathrm{Ba}=\frac{\rho d^2 \lambda^{1/2} \dot{\gamma}}{\mu }$ | Ralph Bagnold | Granular flow (grain collision stresses to viscous fluid stresses) |
| Bejan number | Be | $\mathrm{Be} = \frac{\Delta P L^2} {\mu \alpha}$ | Adrian Bejan | fluid mechanics (dimensionless pressure drop along a channel) |
| Bingham number | Bm | $\mathrm{Bm} = \frac{ \tau_y L }{ \mu V }$ | Eugene C. Bingham | fluid mechanics, rheology (ratio of yield stress to viscous stress) |
| Biot number | Bi | $\mathrm{Bi} = \frac{h L_C}{k_b}$ | Jean-Baptiste Biot | heat transfer (surface vs. volume conductivity of solids) |
| Blake number | Bl or B | $\mathrm{B} = \frac{u \rho}{\mu (1 - \epsilon) D}$ | Frank C. Blake (1892–1926) | geology, fluid mechanics, porous media (inertial over viscous forces in fluid flow through porous media) |
| Bond number | Bo | $\mathrm{Bo} = \frac{\rho a L^2}{\gamma}$ | Wilfrid Noel Bond | geology, fluid mechanics, porous media (buoyant versus capillary forces, similar to the Eötvös number) |
| Brinkman number | Br | $\mathrm{Br} = \frac {\mu U^2}{\kappa (T_w - T_0)}$ | Henri Brinkman | heat transfer, fluid mechanics (conduction from a wall to a viscous fluid) |
| Burger number | Bu | $\mathrm{Bu} = \left(\dfrac{\mathrm{Ro}}{\mathrm{Fr}}\right)^2$ | Alewyn P. Burger (1927–2003) | meteorology, oceanography (density stratification versus Earth's rotation) |
| Brownell–Katz number | N_{BK} | $\mathrm{N}_\mathrm{BK} = \frac{u \mu}{k_\mathrm{rw}\sigma}$ | Lloyd E. Brownell and Donald L. Katz | fluid mechanics (combination of capillary number and Bond number) |
| Capillary number | Ca | $\mathrm{Ca} = \frac{\mu V}{\gamma}$ | —N/a | porous media, fluid mechanics (viscous forces versus surface tension) |
| Cauchy number | Ca | $\mathrm{Ca} = \frac{\rho u^2}{K}$ | Augustin-Louis Cauchy | compressible flows (inertia forces versus compressibility force) |
| Cavitation number | Ca | $\mathrm{Ca}=\frac{p - p_\mathrm{v}}{\frac{1}{2}\rho v^2}$ | —N/a | multiphase flow (hydrodynamic cavitation, pressure over dynamic pressure) |
| Chandrasekhar number | C | $\mathrm{C} = \frac{B^2 L^2}{\mu_o \mu D_M}$ | Subrahmanyan Chandrasekhar | hydromagnetics (Lorentz force versus viscosity) |
| Colburn J factors | J_{M}, J_{H}, J_{D} | | Allan Philip Colburn (1904–1955) | turbulence; heat, mass, and momentum transfer (dimensionless transfer coefficients) |
| Damkohler number | Da | $\mathrm{Da} = k \tau$ | Gerhard Damköhler | chemistry (reaction time scales vs. residence time) |
| Darcy friction factor | C_{f} or f_{D} | | Henry Darcy | fluid mechanics (fraction of pressure losses due to friction in a pipe; four times the Fanning friction factor) |
| Darcy number | Da | $\mathrm{Da} =\frac{k}{d^2}$ | Henry Darcy | Fluid dynamics (permeability of the medium versus its cross-sectional area in porous media) |
| Dean number | D | $\mathrm{D} = \frac{\rho V d}{\mu} \left( \frac{d}{2 R} \right)^{1/2}$ | William Reginald Dean | turbulent flow (vortices in curved ducts) |
| Deborah number | De | $\mathrm{De} = \frac{t_\mathrm{c}}{t_\mathrm{p}}$ | Deborah | rheology (viscoelastic fluids) |
| Drag coefficient | c_{d} | $c_\mathrm{d} = \dfrac{2 F_\mathrm{d}}{\rho v^2 A}\, ,$ | —N/a | aeronautics, fluid dynamics (resistance to fluid motion) |
| Dukhin number | Du | ${\rm Du} = \frac{\kappa^{\sigma}}{{\Kappa_m}a}.$ | Stanislav and Andrei Dukhin | Fluid heterogeneous systems (surface conductivity to various electrokinetic and electroacoustic effects) |
| Eckert number | Ec | $\mathrm{Ec} = \frac{V^2}{c_p\Delta T}$ | Ernst R. G. Eckert | convective heat transfer (characterizes dissipation of energy; ratio of kinetic energy to enthalpy) |
| Ekman number | Ek | $\mathrm{Ek}=\frac{\nu}{2D^2\Omega\sin\varphi}$ | Vagn Walfrid Ekman | Geophysics (viscosity to Coriolis force ratio) |
| Eötvös number | Eo | $\mathrm{Eo}=\frac{\Delta\rho \,g \,L^2}{\sigma}$ | Loránd Eötvös | fluid mechanics (shape of bubbles or drops) |
| Ericksen number | Er | $\mathrm{Er}=\frac{\mu v L}{K}$ | Jerald Ericksen | fluid dynamics (liquid crystal flow behavior; viscous over elastic forces) |
| Euler number | Eu | $\mathrm{Eu}=\frac{\Delta{}p}{\rho V^2}$ | Leonhard Euler | hydrodynamics (stream pressure versus inertia forces) |
| Excess temperature coefficient | $\Theta_r$ | $\Theta_r = \frac{c_p (T-T_e)}{U_e^2/2}$ | —N/a | heat transfer, fluid dynamics (change in internal energy versus kinetic energy) |
| Fanning friction factor | f | | John T. Fanning | fluid mechanics (fraction of pressure losses due to friction in a pipe; 1/4th the Darcy friction factor) |
| Froude number | Fr | $\mathrm{Fr} = \frac{U}{\sqrt{g\ell}}$ | William Froude | fluid mechanics (wave and surface behaviour; ratio of a body's inertia to gravitational forces) |
| Galilei number | Ga | $\mathrm{Ga} = \frac{g\, L^3}{\nu^2}$ | Galileo Galilei | fluid mechanics (gravitational over viscous forces) |
| Görtler number | G | $\mathrm{G} = \frac{U_e \theta}{\nu} \left( \frac{\theta}{R} \right)^{1/2}$ | Henry Görtler | fluid dynamics (boundary layer flow along a concave wall) |
| Goucher number | Go | $\mathrm{Go} = R \left(\frac {\rho g }{2 \sigma} \right)^{1/2}$ | Frederick Shand Goucher (1888–1973) | fluid dynamics (wire coating problems) |
| Garcia-Atance number | G_{A} | $\mathrm{ G_A} = \frac{ p - p_v }{\rho a L}$ | Gonzalo Garcia-Atance Fatjo | phase change (ultrasonic cavitation onset, ratio of pressures over pressure due to acceleration) |
| Graetz number | Gz | $\mathrm{Gz} = {D_H \over L} \mathrm{Re}\, \mathrm{Pr}$ | Leo Graetz | heat transfer, fluid mechanics (laminar flow through a conduit; also used in mass transfer) |
| Grashof number | Gr | $\mathrm{Gr}_L = \frac{g \beta (T_s - T_\infty ) L^3}{\nu ^2}$ | Franz Grashof | heat transfer, natural convection (ratio of the buoyancy to viscous force) |
| Hartmann number | Ha | $\mathrm{Ha} = BL \left( \frac{\sigma}{\rho\nu} \right)^\frac{1}{2}$ | Julius Hartmann (1881–1951) | magnetohydrodynamics (ratio of Lorentz to viscous forces) |
| Hagen number | Hg | $\mathrm{Hg} = -\frac{1}{\rho}\frac{\mathrm{d} p}{\mathrm{d} x}\frac{L^3}{\nu^2}$ | Gotthilf Hagen | heat transfer (ratio of the buoyancy to viscous force in forced convection) |
| Iribarren number | Ir | $\mathrm{Ir} = \frac{\tan \alpha}{\sqrt{H/L_0}}$ | Ramón Iribarren | wave mechanics (breaking surface gravity waves on a slope) |
| Jakob number | Ja | $\mathrm{Ja} = \frac{c_{p,f}(T_w - T_{sat})}{h_{fg}}$ | Max Jakob | heat transfer (ratio of sensible heat to latent heat during phase changes) |
| Karlovitz number | Ka | $\mathrm{Ka} = k t_c$ | Béla Karlovitz | turbulent combustion (characteristic flow time times flame stretch rate) |
| Kapitza number | Ka | $\mathrm{Ka} = \frac{\sigma}{\rho(g\sin\beta)^{1/3}\nu^{4/3}}$ | Pyotr Kapitsa | fluid mechanics (thin film of liquid flows down inclined surfaces) |
| Keulegan–Carpenter number | K_{C} | $\mathrm{K_C} = \frac{V\,T}{L}$ | Garbis H. Keulegan (1890–1989) and Lloyd H. Carpenter | fluid dynamics (ratio of drag force to inertia for a bluff object in oscillatory fluid flow) |
| Knudsen number | Kn | $\mathrm{Kn} = \frac {\lambda}{L}$ | Martin Knudsen | gas dynamics (ratio of the molecular mean free path length to a representative physical length scale) |
| Kutateladze number | Ku | $\mathrm{Ku} = \frac{U_h \rho_g^{1/2}}{\left({\sigma g (\rho_l - \rho_g)}\right)^{1/4}}$ | Samson Kutateladze | fluid mechanics (counter-current two-phase flow) |
| Laplace number | La | $\mathrm{La} = \frac{\sigma \rho L}{\mu^2}$ | Pierre-Simon Laplace | fluid dynamics (free convection within immiscible fluids; ratio of surface tension to momentum-transport) |
| Lewis number | Le | $\mathrm{Le} = \frac{\alpha}{D} = \frac{\mathrm{Sc}}{\mathrm{Pr}}$ | Warren K. Lewis | heat and mass transfer (ratio of thermal to mass diffusivity) |
| Lift coefficient | C_{L} | $C_\mathrm{L} = \frac{L}{q\,S}$ | —N/a | aerodynamics (lift available from an airfoil at a given angle of attack) |
| Lockhart–Martinelli parameter | $\chi$ | $\chi = \frac{m_\ell}{m_g} \sqrt{\frac{\rho_g}{\rho_\ell}}$ | R. W. Lockhart and Raymond C. Martinelli | two-phase flow (flow of wet gases; liquid fraction) |
| Mach number | M or Ma | $\mathrm{M} = \frac{{v}}{{v_\mathrm{sound}}}$ | Ernst Mach | gas dynamics (compressible flow; dimensionless velocity) |
| Marangoni number | Mg | $\mathrm{Mg} = - {\frac{\mathrm{d}\sigma}{\mathrm{d}T}}\frac{L \Delta T}{\eta \alpha}$ | Carlo Marangoni | fluid mechanics (Marangoni flow; thermal surface tension forces over viscous forces) |
| Markstein number | Ma | $\mathrm{Ma} = \frac{L_b}{l_f}$ | George H. Markstein | turbulence, combustion (Markstein length to laminar flame thickness) |
| Morton number | Mo | $\mathrm{Mo} = \frac{g \mu_c^4 \, \Delta \rho}{\rho_c^2 \sigma^3}$ | Rose Morton | fluid dynamics (determination of bubble/drop shape) |
| Nusselt number | Nu | $\mathrm{Nu} =\frac{hd}{k}$ | Wilhelm Nusselt | heat transfer (forced convection; ratio of convective to conductive heat transfer) |
| Ohnesorge number | Oh | $\mathrm{Oh} = \frac{ \mu}{ \sqrt{\rho \sigma L }} = \frac{\sqrt{\mathrm{We}}}{\mathrm{Re}}$ | Wolfgang von Ohnesorge | fluid dynamics (atomization of liquids, Marangoni flow) |
| Péclet number | Pe | $\mathrm{Pe} = \frac{L u}{D}$ or $\mathrm{Pe} = \frac{L u}{\alpha}$ | Jean Claude Eugène Péclet | fluid mechanics (ratio of advective transport rate over molecular diffusive transport rate), heat transfer (ratio of advective transport rate over thermal diffusive transport rate) |
| Prandtl number | Pr | $\mathrm{Pr} = \frac{\nu}{\alpha} = \frac{c_p \mu}{k}$ | Ludwig Prandtl | heat transfer (ratio of viscous diffusion rate over thermal diffusion rate) |
| Pressure coefficient | C_{P} | $C_p = {p - p_\infty \over \frac{1}{2} \rho_\infty V_\infty^2}$ | | aerodynamics, hydrodynamics (pressure experienced at a point on an airfoil; dimensionless pressure variable) |
| Rayleigh number | Ra | $\mathrm{Ra}_{x} = \frac{g \beta} {\nu \alpha} (T_s - T_\infin) x^3$ | John William Strutt, 3rd Baron Rayleigh | heat transfer (buoyancy versus viscous forces in free convection) |
| Reynolds number | Re | $\mathrm{Re} = \frac{U L\rho}{\mu}=\frac{U L}{\nu}$ | Osborne Reynolds | fluid mechanics (ratio of fluid inertial and viscous forces) |
| Richardson number | Ri | $\mathrm{Ri} = \frac{gh}{U^2} = \frac{1}{\mathrm{Fr}^2}$ | Lewis Fry Richardson | fluid dynamics (effect of buoyancy on flow stability; ratio of potential over kinetic energy) |
| Roshko number | Ro | $\mathrm{Ro} = {f L^{2}\over \nu} =\mathrm{St}\,\mathrm{Re}$ | Anatol Roshko | fluid dynamics (oscillating flow, vortex shedding) |
| Rossby number | Ro | $\text{Ro} = \frac{U}{Lf},$ | Carl-Gustaf Rossby | fluid flow (geophysics, ratio of inertial force to Coriolis force) |
| Rouse number | P | $\mathrm{P} = \frac{w_s}{\kappa u_*}$ | Hunter Rouse | Fluid dynamics (concentration profile of suspended sediment) |
| Schmidt number | Sc | $\mathrm{Sc} = \frac{\nu}{D}$ | Ernst Heinrich Wilhelm Schmidt (1892–1975) | mass transfer (viscous over molecular diffusion rate) |
| Scruton number | Sc | $\mathrm{Sc} = \frac{2\delta_sm_e}{\rho b^2_\text{ref}}$ | Christopher 'Kit' Scruton | Fluid dynamics (vortex resonance) |
| Shape factor | H | $H = \frac {\delta^*}{\theta}$ | —N/a | boundary layer flow (ratio of displacement thickness to momentum thickness) |
| Sherwood number | Sh | $\mathrm{Sh} = \frac{K L}{D}$ | Thomas Kilgore Sherwood | mass transfer (forced convection; ratio of convective to diffusive mass transport) |
| Shields parameter | θ | $\theta = \frac{\tau}{(\rho_s-\rho) g D}$ | Albert F. Shields | Fluid dynamics (motion of sediment) |
| Sommerfeld number | S | $\mathrm{S} = \left( \frac{r}{c} \right)^2 \frac {\mu N}{P}$ | Arnold Sommerfeld | hydrodynamic lubrication (boundary lubrication) |
| Stanton number | St | $\mathrm{St} = \frac{h}{c_p \rho V} = \frac{\mathrm{Nu}}{\mathrm{Re}\,\mathrm{Pr}}$ | Thomas Ernest Stanton | heat transfer and fluid dynamics (forced convection) |
| Stokes number | Stk or S_{k} | $\mathrm{Stk} = \frac{\tau U_o}{d_c}$ | Sir George Stokes, 1st Baronet | particles suspensions (ratio of characteristic time of particle to time of flow) |
| Strouhal number | St | $\mathrm{St} = \frac{f L}{U}$ | Vincenc Strouhal | Vortex shedding (ratio of characteristic oscillatory velocity to ambient flow velocity) |
| Stuart number | N | $\mathrm{N} = \frac {B^2 L_{c} \sigma}{\rho U} = \frac{\mathrm{Ha}^2}{\mathrm{Re}}$ | John Trevor Stuart | magnetohydrodynamics (ratio of electromagnetic to inertial forces) |
| Taylor number | Ta | $\mathrm{Ta} = \frac{4\Omega^2 R^4}{\nu^2}$ | G. I. Taylor | fluid dynamics (rotating fluid flows; inertial forces due to rotation of a fluid versus viscous forces) |
| Thoma number | σ | $\mathrm{\sigma}=\frac{ \mathrm{NPSH} }{h_\mathrm{pump}}$ | Dieter Thoma (1881–1942) | multiphase flow (hydrodynamic cavitation, pressure over dynamic pressure) |
| Ursell number | U | $\mathrm{U} = \frac{H\, \lambda^2}{h^3}$ | Fritz Ursell | wave mechanics (nonlinearity of surface gravity waves on a shallow fluid layer) |
| Wallis parameter | j^{∗} | $j^* = R \left( \frac{\omega \rho}{\mu} \right)^\frac{1}{2}$ | Graham B. Wallis | multiphase flows (nondimensional superficial velocity) |
| Weber number | We | $\mathrm{We} = \frac{\rho v^2 l}{\sigma}$ | Moritz Weber | multiphase flow (strongly curved surfaces; ratio of inertia to surface tension) |
| Weissenberg number | Wi | $\mathrm{Wi} = \dot{\gamma} \lambda$ | Karl Weissenberg | viscoelastic flows (shear rate times the relaxation time) |
| Womersley number | $\alpha$ | $\alpha = R \left( \frac{\omega \rho}{\mu} \right)^\frac{1}{2}$ | John R. Womersley | biofluid mechanics (continuous and pulsating flows; ratio of pulsatile flow frequency to viscous effects) |
| Zeldovich number | $\beta$ | $\beta = \frac{E}{RT_f} \frac{T_f-T_o}{T_f}$ | Yakov Zeldovich | fluid dynamics, Combustion (Measure of activation energy) |
