= Drop impact =

Result of a liquid droplet striking a solid or liquid surface

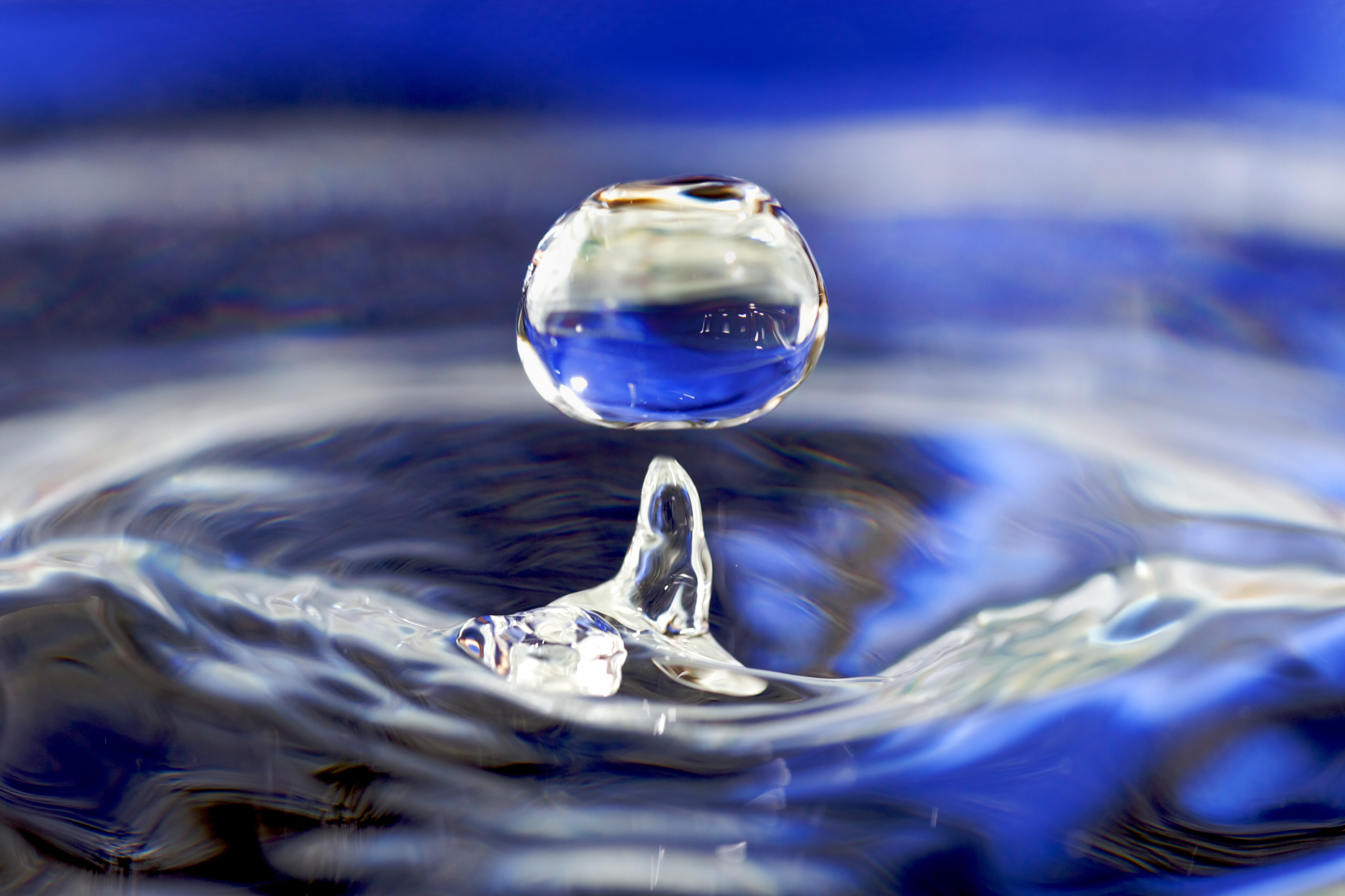
A drop striking a liquid surface; in this case, both the drop and the surface are water.

In fluid dynamics, drop impact occurs when a drop of liquid strikes a solid or liquid surface. The resulting outcome depends on the properties of the drop, the surface, and the surrounding fluid, which is most commonly a gas.

== On a dry solid surface ==
When a liquid drop strikes a dry solid surface, it generally spreads on the surface, and then will retract if the impact is energetic enough to cause the drop to spread out more than it would generally spread due to its static receding contact angle. The specific outcome of the impact depends mostly upon the drop size, velocity, surface tension, viscosity, and also upon the surface roughness and the contact angle between the drop and the surface. Droplet impact parameters such as contact time and impact regime can be modified and controlled by different passive and active methods.

=== Summary of possible outcomes ===
- "Deposition" is said to occur when the drop spreads on the surface at impact and remains attached to the surface during the entire impact process without breaking up. This outcome is representative of impact of small, low-velocity drops onto smooth wetting surfaces.
- The "prompt splash" outcome occurs when the drop strikes a rough surface, and is characterized by the generation of droplets at the contact line (where solid, gas, and liquid meet) at the beginning of the process of spreading of the drop on the surface, when the liquid has a high outward velocity.
- At reduced surface tension, the liquid layer can detach from the wall, resulting in a "corona splash".

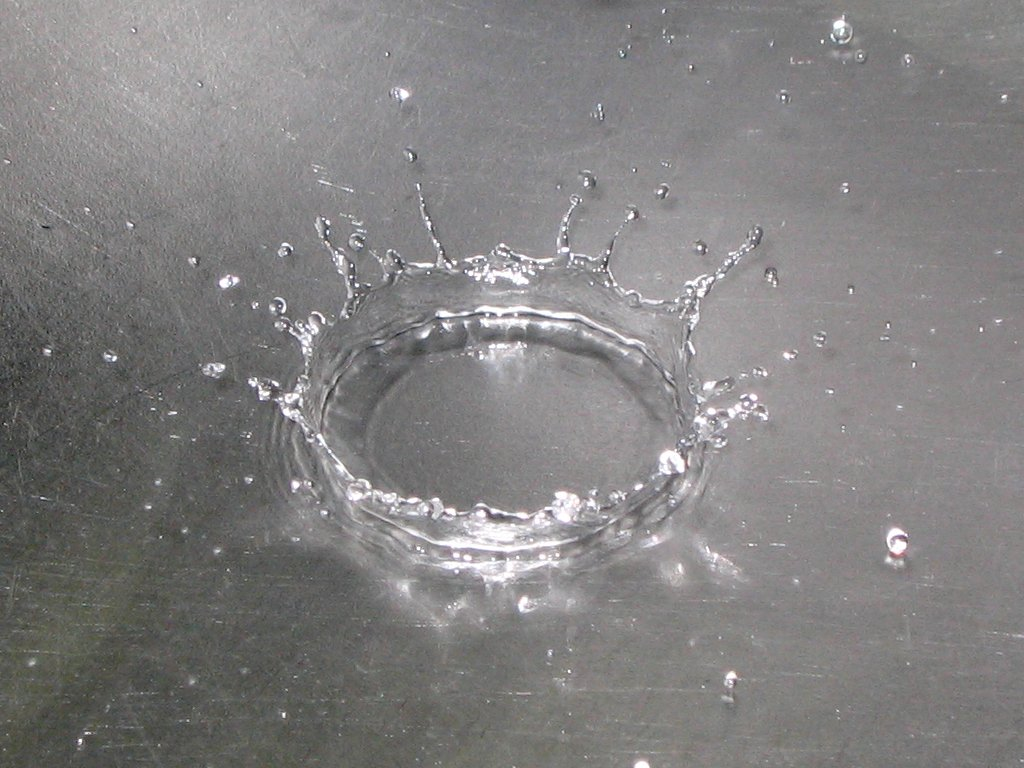
Corona splash on a dry solid surface.

- On a wetting surface, "receding breakup" can occur as the liquid retracts from its maximum spreading radius, due to the fact that the contact angle decreases during retraction, causing some drops to be left behind by the receding drop. On superhydrophobic surfaces, the retracting drop can break up into a number of fingers which are each capable of further breakup, likely due to capillary instability. Such satellite droplets have been observed to break off from the impacting drop both during the spreading and retracting phases.
- "Rebound" and "partial rebound" outcomes can occur when a drop recedes after impact. As the drop recedes to the impact point, the kinetic energy of the collapsing drop causes the liquid to squeeze upward, forming a vertical liquid column. The case where drop stays partially on the surface but launches one or more drops at its top is known as partial rebound, whereas the case where the entire drop leaves the solid surface due to this upward motion is known as complete rebound. The difference between rebound and partial rebound is caused by the receding contact angle of the drop on the surface. For low values a partial rebound occurs, while for high values a complete rebound occurs (assuming that the drop recedes with enough kinetic energy). Addition of polymers like xanthan into water alters its rheological properties, transitioning it from a Newtonian fluid to a viscoelastic one. Consequently, this modification affects the shape of the droplet upon rebounding from a solid surface.

=== On superhydrophobic surfaces ===
==== Small drop deformation ====
On superhydrophobic surfaces, liquid drops are observed to bounce off of the solid surface. Richard and Quéré showed that a small liquid drop was able to bounce off of a solid surface over 20 times before coming to rest. Of particular interest is the length of time that the drop remains in contact with the solid surface. This is important in applications such as heat transfer and aircraft icing. To find a relationship between drop size and contact time for low Weber number impacts (We << 1) on superhydrophobic surfaces (which experience little deformation), a simple balance between inertia ($\rho R / \tau^2$) and capillarity ($\sigma/R^2$) can be used, as follows:

$\rho R / \tau^2 \propto \sigma/R^2$

where $\rho$ is the drop density, R is the drop radius, $\tau$ is the characteristic time scale, and $\sigma$ is the drop surface tension.

This yields

$\tau \propto \sqrt{\rho/\sigma}R^{3/2}$.

The contact time is independent of velocity in this regime. The minimum contact time for a low deformation drop (We << 1) is approximated by the lowest-order oscillation period for a spherical drop., giving the characteristic time a prefactor of approximately 2.2. For large-deformation drops (We > 1), similar contact times are seen even though dynamics of impact are different, as discussed below. If the droplet is split into multiple droplets, the contact time is reduced.

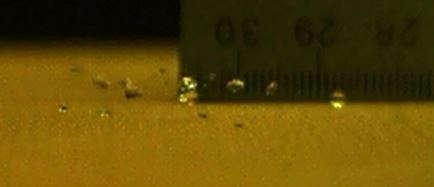
Breakup of a water drop impacting a superhydrophobic surface at a Weber number of approximately 214.

By creating tapered surfaces with large spacing, the impacting droplet will exhibit the counterintuitive pancake bouncing, characterized by the droplet bouncing off at the end of spreading without retraction, resulting in ~80% contact time reduction.

==== Significant drop deformation ====
As the Weber number increases, the drop deformation upon impact also increases. The drop deformation pattern can be split up into regimes based on the Weber number.

- At We << 1, there is not significant deformation.
- For We on the order of 1, the drop experiences significant deformation, and flattens somewhat on the surface.
- When We ~ 4, waves form on the drop.
- When We ~ 18, satellite droplet(s) break off of the drop, which is now an elongated vertical column.
- For large We (for which the magnitude depends on the specific surface structure), many satellite drops break off during spreading and/or retraction of the drop.

== On a wet solid surface ==
When a liquid drop strikes a wet solid surface (a surface covered with a thin layer of liquid that exceeds the height of surface roughness), either spreading or splashing will occur. If the velocity is below a critical value, the liquid will spread on the surface, similar to deposition described above. If the velocity exceeds the critical velocity, splashing will occur and shock wave can be generated. Splashing on thin fluid films occurs in the form of a corona, similar to that seen for dry solid surfaces. Under proper conditions, droplet hitting a liquid interface can also display a superhydrophobic-like bouncing, characterized by the contact time, spreading dynamics and restitution coefficient independent of the underlying liquid properties.

== On a liquid surface ==
When a liquid drop strikes the surface of a liquid reservoir, it will either float, bounce, coalesce with the reservoir, or splash. In the case of floating, a drop will float on the surface for several seconds. Cleanliness of the liquid surface is reportedly very important in the ability of drops to float. Drop bouncing can occur on perturbed liquid surfaces. If the drop is able to rupture a thin film of gas separating it from the liquid reservoir, it can coalesce. Finally, higher Weber number drop impacts (with greater energy) produce splashing. In the splashing regime, the striking drop creates a crater in the fluid surface, followed by a crown around the crater. Additionally, a central jet, called the Rayleigh jet or Worthington jet, protrudes from the center of the crater. If the impact energy is high enough, the jet rises to the point where it pinches off, sending one or more droplets upward out of the surface.

== See also ==
- Splash (fluid mechanics)
