= Tesla valve =

Valve design

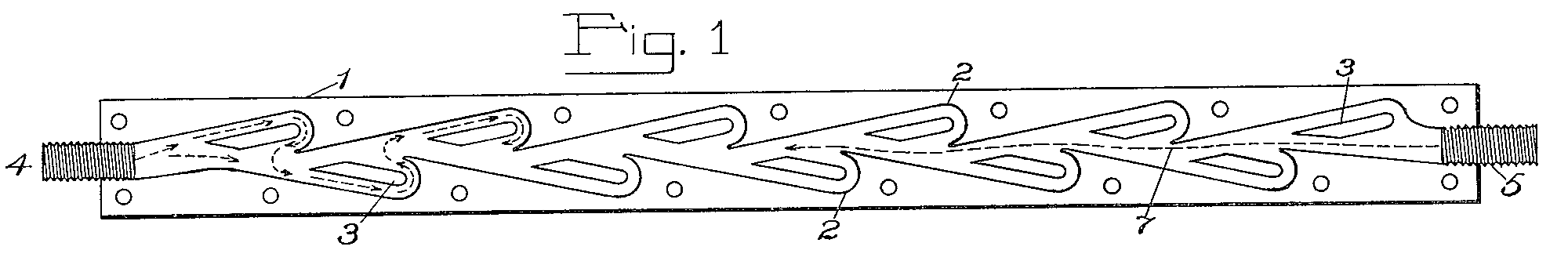
Cross-section of a Tesla valve, displaying its cavity design, from the original patent application.

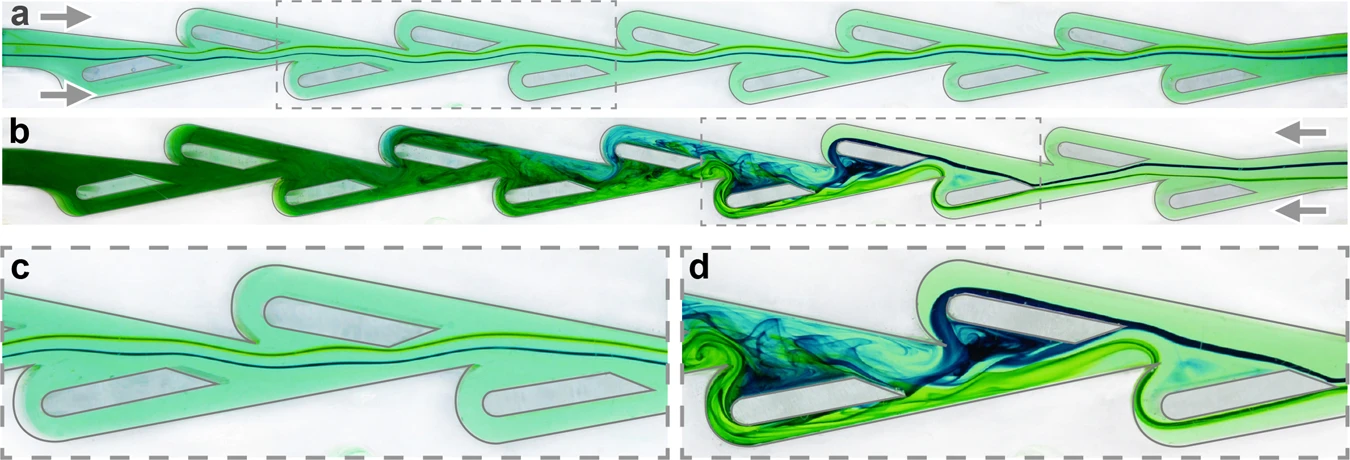
Streakline flow visualization at Re=200 using dye injected upstream: (a) Forward direction. Two adjacent filaments remain in the central corridor of the conduit with only small lateral deflections. (b) Reverse direction. The filaments ricochet off the periodic structures, deflecting increasingly sharply before being rerouted around the 'islands' and mixing. (c) and (d) are zoomed-in images

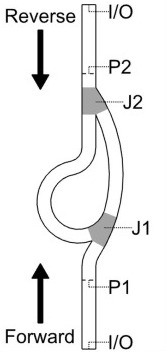
Schematic of a Tesla-type D-valve.

A Tesla valve, called a valvular conduit by its inventor, is a fixed-geometry passive check valve. It allows a fluid to flow preferentially in one direction, without moving parts. The device is named after Nikola Tesla, who was awarded U.S. patent 1,329,559 in 1920 for its invention. The patent application describes the invention as follows:

The interior of the conduit is provided with enlargements, recesses, projections, baffles, or buckets which, while offering virtually no resistance to the passage of the fluid in one direction, other than surface friction, constitute an almost impassable barrier to its flow in the opposite direction.

Tesla illustrated this with the drawing, showing one possible construction with a series of eleven flow-control segments, although any other number of such segments could be used as desired to increase or decrease the flow regulation effect.

== History ==
Tesla filed the application for the valvular conduit on 21 February 1916. In a supplementary Office Action of 25 November 1916, the United States Patent Office initially rejected all of the application's claims over an 1898 Swiss patent, CH 18298, granted to Frederick Edwards of London for a pump whose channel contains chambers and pocket-like recesses that cause liquid to meet greater resistance in one direction than in the other. Tesla responded in November 1917 with an amendment adding to the specification the acknowledgment that "asymmetrical conduits have been constructed and their use proposed in connection with engines", while arguing that these were "incapable of acting as valves proper" and much less efficient than his design; the passage appears in the granted patent. The patent was granted on 3 February 1920.

== Diodicity ==
The valves are structures that have a higher pressure drop for the flow in one direction (reverse) than the other (forward). This difference in flow resistance causes a net directional flow rate in the forward direction in oscillating flows. The efficiency is often expressed in diodicity $\mathrm{Di}$, being the ratio of directional resistances.

The flow resistance is defined, analogously to Ohm's law for electrical resistance, as the ratio of applied pressure drop and resulting flow rate:
$$R =  \frac{\Delta p}{Q}$$
where $\Delta p$ is the applied pressure difference between two ends of the conduit, and $Q$ the flow rate.

The diodicity is then the ratio of the reversed flow resistance to the forward flow resistance:
$$\mathrm {Di} =  \frac{R_{\rm r}}{R_{\rm f}}\,.$$
If $\mathrm{Di} >1$, the conduit in question has diodic behavior.

Thus diodicity is also the ratio of pressure drops for identical flow rates:
$$\mathrm {Di} = \left( \frac{\Delta p_{\rm r}}{\Delta p_{\rm f}} \right)_Q,$$
where $\Delta p_{\rm r}$ is the reverse flow pressure drop, and $\Delta p_{\rm f}$ the forward flow pressure drop for flow rate $Q$.

Equivalently, diodicity could also be defined as ratio of dimensionless Hagen number or Darcy friction factor at the same Reynolds number.

== Applications ==
With no moving parts, Tesla valves are much more resistant to wear and fatigue, especially in applications with frequent pressure reversal such as a pulsejet.

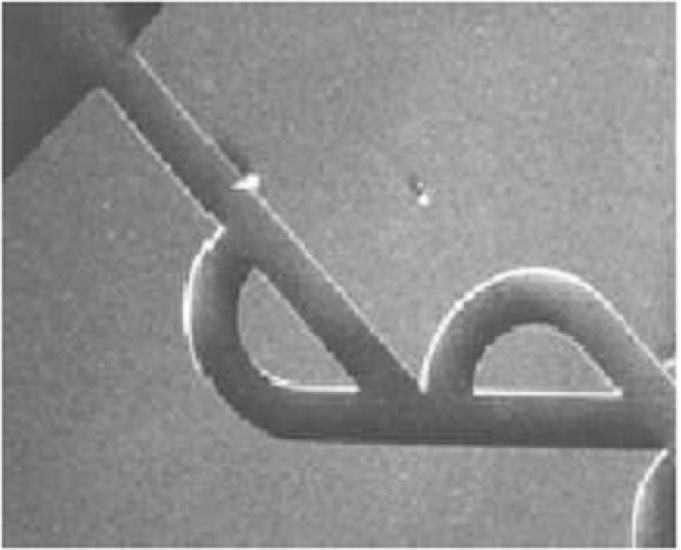
A micrograph of a Tesla valve in a fixed-valve micro-pump, with flow from right to left restricted

The Tesla valve is used in microfluidic applications and offers advantages such as scalability, durability, and ease of fabrication in a variety of materials. It is also used in macrofluidic applications and pulse jet engines. In 2021 Xiaomi announced that some of their mobile phones will be using loop liquid cooling technology. This technology uses a Tesla valve to make sure that the coolant flow is unidirectional.

Principle of operation of a Tesla valve: The upper figure shows flow in the blocking direction: at each segment, part of the fluid is turned around (red) and interferes with the forward flow (black). The lower figure shows flow in the unimpeded direction (blue).

One computational fluid dynamics simulation of Tesla valves with two and four segments showed that the flow resistance in the blocking (or reverse) direction was about 15 and 40 times greater, respectively, than the unimpeded (or forward) direction. This lends support to Tesla's patent assertion that in the valvular conduit in his diagram, a pressure ratio "approximating 200 can be obtained so that the device acts as a slightly leaking valve".

Steady flow experiments, including with the original design, however, show smaller ratios of the two resistances in the range of 2 to 4. It has also been shown that the device works better with pulsatile flows.

== See also ==
- Coandă effect
- Check valve
- Diode
- Labyrinth seal
- Static mixer
- Valve
