= Characteristic number =

Characteristic number may mean:

- Characteristic number (mathematics)
- Characteristic number (physics)
- Characteristic number (fluid dynamics)
