= Morton number =

Dimensionless number in fluid dynamics

In fluid dynamics, the Morton number (Mo) is a dimensionless number used together with the Eötvös number or Bond number to characterize the shape of bubbles or drops moving in a surrounding fluid or continuous phase, c. It is named after Rose Morton, who described it with W. L. Haberman in 1953.

== Definition ==
The Morton number is defined as

$$\mathrm{Mo} = \frac{g \mu_c^4 \, \Delta \rho}{\rho_c^2 \sigma^3},$$

where g is the acceleration of gravity, $\mu_c$ is the viscosity of the surrounding fluid, $\rho_c$ the density of the surrounding fluid, $\Delta \rho$ the difference in density of the phases, and $\sigma$ is the surface tension coefficient. For the case of a bubble with a negligible inner density the Morton number can be simplified to

$$\mathrm{Mo} = \frac{g\mu_c^4}{\rho_c \sigma^3}.$$

== Relation to other parameters ==
The Morton number can also be expressed by using a combination of the Weber number, Froude number and Reynolds number,

$$\mathrm{Mo} = \frac{\mathrm{We}^3}{\mathrm{Fr}^2\, \mathrm{Re}^4}.$$

The Froude number in the above expression is defined as

$$\mathrm{Fr^2} = \frac{V^2}{g d}$$

where V is a reference velocity and d is the equivalent diameter of the drop or bubble.
