= Laplace number =

Dimensionless parameter in fluid mechanics

The Laplace number (La), also known as the Suratman number (Su), is a dimensionless number used in the characterization of free surface fluid dynamics. It represents a ratio of surface tension to the momentum-transport (especially dissipation) inside a fluid. It is named after Pierre-Simon Laplace and Indonesian physicist P. C. Suratman.

It is defined as follows:

$$\mathrm{La} = \mathrm{Su} = \frac{\sigma \rho L}{\mu^2}$$

where:

- σ = surface tension
- ρ = density
- L = length
- μ = liquid viscosity

Laplace number is related to Reynolds number (Re) and Weber number (We) in the following way:

$$\mathrm{La} = \frac{\mathrm{Re}^2}{\mathrm{We}}$$

== See also ==
- Ohnesorge number - There is an inverse relationship, $\mathrm{La} = \mathrm{Oh}^{-2}$, between the Laplace number and the Ohnesorge number.
