= Brinkman number =

Dimensionless number in fluid mechanics

The Brinkman number (Br) is a dimensionless number related to heat conduction from a wall to a flowing viscous fluid, commonly used in polymer processing. It is named after the Dutch mathematician and physicist Frank Brinkman. There are several definitions; one is

$\mathrm{Br} = \frac {\mu u^2}{\kappa(T_w-T_0)} = \mathrm{Pr} \, \mathrm{Ec}$

where

- μ is the dynamic viscosity;
- u is the flow velocity;
- κ is the thermal conductivity;
- T_{0} is the bulk fluid temperature;
- T_{w} is the wall temperature;
- Pr is the Prandtl number
- Ec is the Eckert number

It is the ratio between heat produced by viscous dissipation and heat transported by molecular conduction. i.e., the ratio of viscous heat generation to external heating. The higher its value, the slower the conduction of heat produced by viscous dissipation and hence the larger the temperature rise.

In, for example, a screw extruder, the energy supplied to the polymer melt comes primarily from two sources:

- viscous heat generated by shear between elements of the flowing liquid moving at different velocities;
- direct heat conduction from the wall of the extruder.

The former is supplied by the motor turning the screw, the latter by heaters. The Brinkman number is a measure of the ratio of the two.
