= Diode bridge =

Circuit arrangement of four diodes

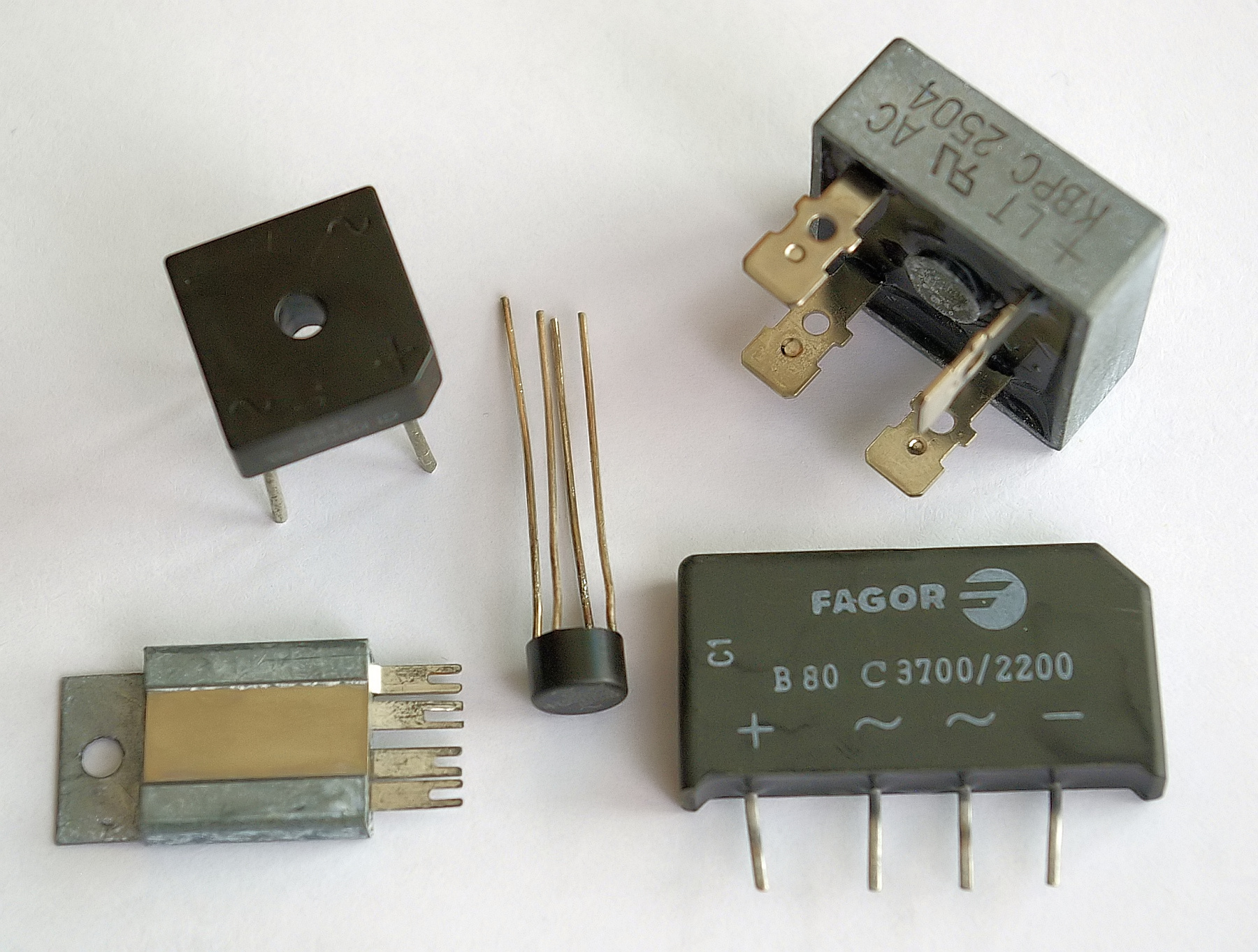
- Diode bridge in various packages
- Component type: Semiconductor
- Inventor: Karol Pollak

Electronic symbol
- 2 alternating-current (AC) inputs converted into 2 direct-current (DC) outputs

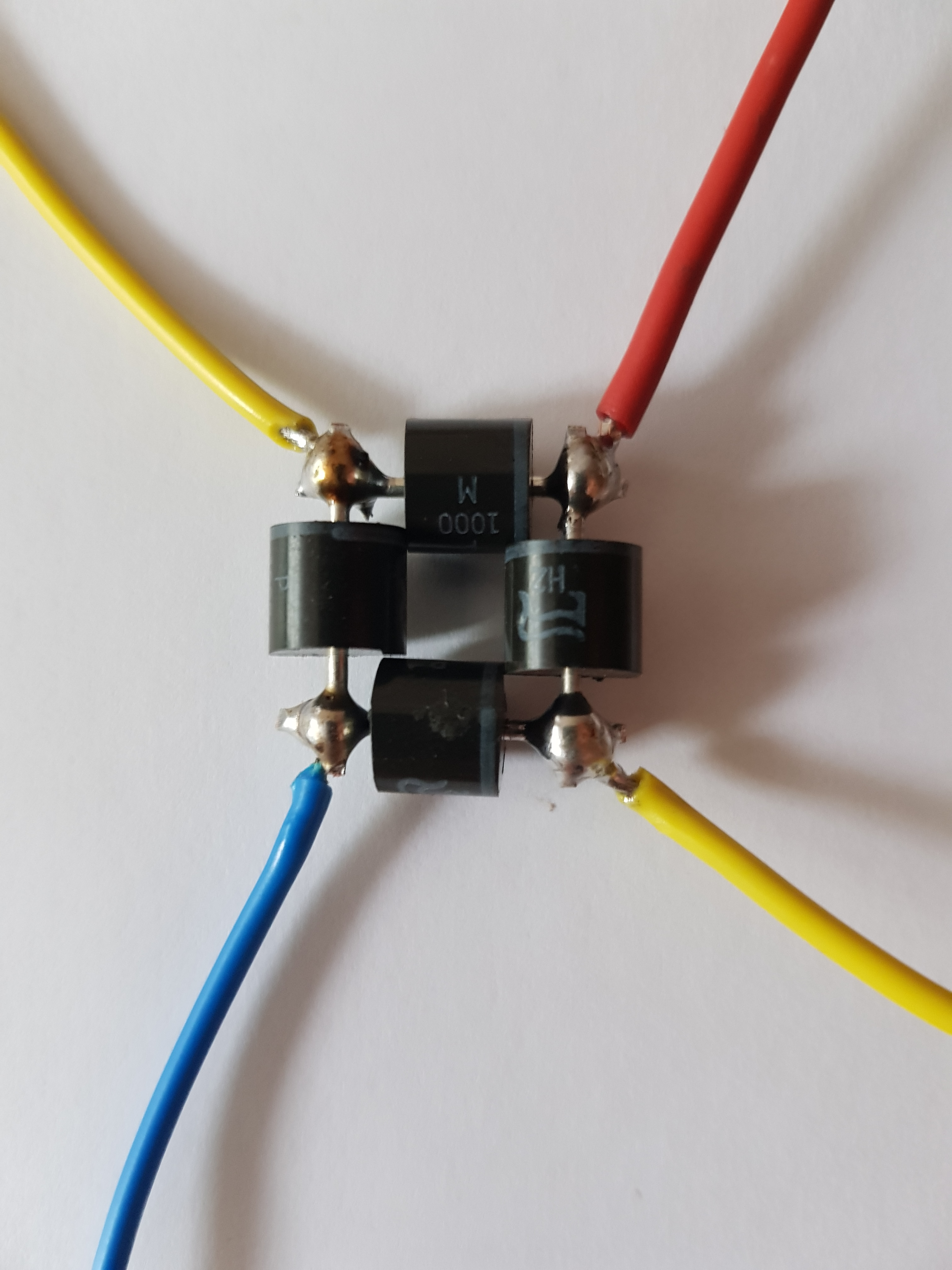
A hand-made diode bridge. The silver band on the diodes indicates the cathode side of the diode.

A diode bridge is a bridge rectifier circuit of four diodes that is used in the process of converting alternating current (AC) from the input terminals to direct current (DC, i.e. fixed polarity) on the output terminals. Its function is to convert the negative voltage portions of the AC waveform to positive voltage, after which a low-pass filter can be used to smooth the result into DC.

When used in its most common application, for conversion of an alternating-current (AC) input into a direct-current (DC) output, it is known as a bridge rectifier. A bridge rectifier provides full-wave rectification from a two-wire AC input, resulting in lower cost and weight as compared to a rectifier with a three-wire input from a transformer with a center-tapped secondary winding.

Prior to the availability of integrated circuits, a bridge rectifier was constructed from separate diodes. Since about 1950, a single four-terminal component containing the four diodes connected in a bridge configuration has been available and is now available with various voltage and current ratings.

Diodes are also used in bridge topologies along with capacitors as voltage multipliers.

== History ==
The diode bridge circuit was invented by Karol Pollak and patented in December 1895 in Great Britain and in January 1896 in Germany. Two years later in 1897, Leo Graetz independently published a similar circuit only to discover that the Pollak accumulator factory in Frankfurt am Main was already entering commercial production with its bridge circuit. Nevertheless the circuit is sometimes referred to as a "Graetz circuit" or "Graetz bridge".

== Current flow ==
According to the conventional model of current flow, originally established by Benjamin Franklin and still followed by most engineers today, current flows through electrical conductors from the positive to the negative pole (defined as positive flow). In actuality, free electrons in a conductor nearly always flow from the negative to the positive pole. In the vast majority of applications, however, the actual direction of current flow is irrelevant. Therefore, in the discussion below the conventional model is retained.

The fundamental characteristic of a diode is that current can flow only one way through it, which is defined as the forward direction. A diode bridge uses diodes as series components to allow current to pass in the forward direction during the positive part of the AC cycle and as shunt components to redirect current flowing in the reverse direction during the negative part of the AC cycle to the opposite rails.

== Rectifier ==
In the diagrams below, when the input connected to the left corner of the diamond is positive, and the input connected to the right corner is negative, current flows from the upper supply terminal to the right along the red (positive) path to the output and returns to the lower supply terminal through the blue (negative) path.

When the input connected to the left corner is negative, and the input connected to the right corner is positive, current flows from the lower supply terminal to the right along the red (positive) path to the output and returns to the upper supply terminal through the blue (negative) path.

An animation of how a diode bridge converts alternating current (AC) to direct current (DC). Only 2 diodes at a given time are in forward bias.

In each case, the upper right output remains positive, and lower right output negative. Since this is true whether the input is AC or DC, this circuit not only produces a DC output from an AC input, it can also provide reverse-polarity protection; that is, it permits normal functioning of DC-powered equipment when batteries have been installed backwards, or when the leads from a DC power source have been reversed, and protects the equipment from potential damage caused by reverse polarity.

Alternatives to the diode-bridge full-wave rectifiers are the center-tapped transformer and double-diode rectifier, and voltage doubler rectifier using two diodes and two capacitors in a bridge topology.

AC, half-wave and full-wave rectified signals

== Smoothing circuits ==
With AC input, the output of a diode bridge (called a full-wave rectifier for this purpose; there is also half-wave rectification, which does not use a diode bridge) is polarized pulsating non-sinusoidal voltage of the same amplitude but twice the frequency of the input. It may be considered as DC voltage upon which is superimposed a very large ripple voltage. This kind of electric power is not very usable, because ripple is dissipated as waste heat in DC circuit components and may cause noise or distortion during circuit operation. So nearly all rectifiers are followed by a series of bandpass or bandstop filters and/or a voltage regulator to convert most or all of the ripple voltage into a smoother and possibly higher DC output. A filter may be as simple as a single sufficiently large capacitor or choke, but most power-supply filters have multiple alternating series and shunt components. When the ripple voltage rises, reactive power is stored in the filter components, reducing the voltage; when the ripple voltage falls, reactive power is discharged from the filter components, raising the voltage. The final stage of rectification may consist of a zener diode-based voltage regulator, which almost completely eliminates any residual ripple.

== Polyphase diode bridges ==
The diode bridge can be generalized to rectify polyphase AC inputs. For example, for a three-phase AC input, a half-wave rectifier consists of three diodes, but a full-wave bridge rectifier consists of six diodes.

A half-wave rectifier may be considered a wye connection (star connection), because it returns the current through the center (neutral) wire. A full-wave rectifier is more like a delta connection, although it can be connected to the three-phase source of either wye or delta and it does not use the center (neutral) wire.

Three-phase full-wave bridge rectifier

3-phase AC input waveform (top), half-wave rectified waveform (center), and full-wave rectified waveform (bottom)

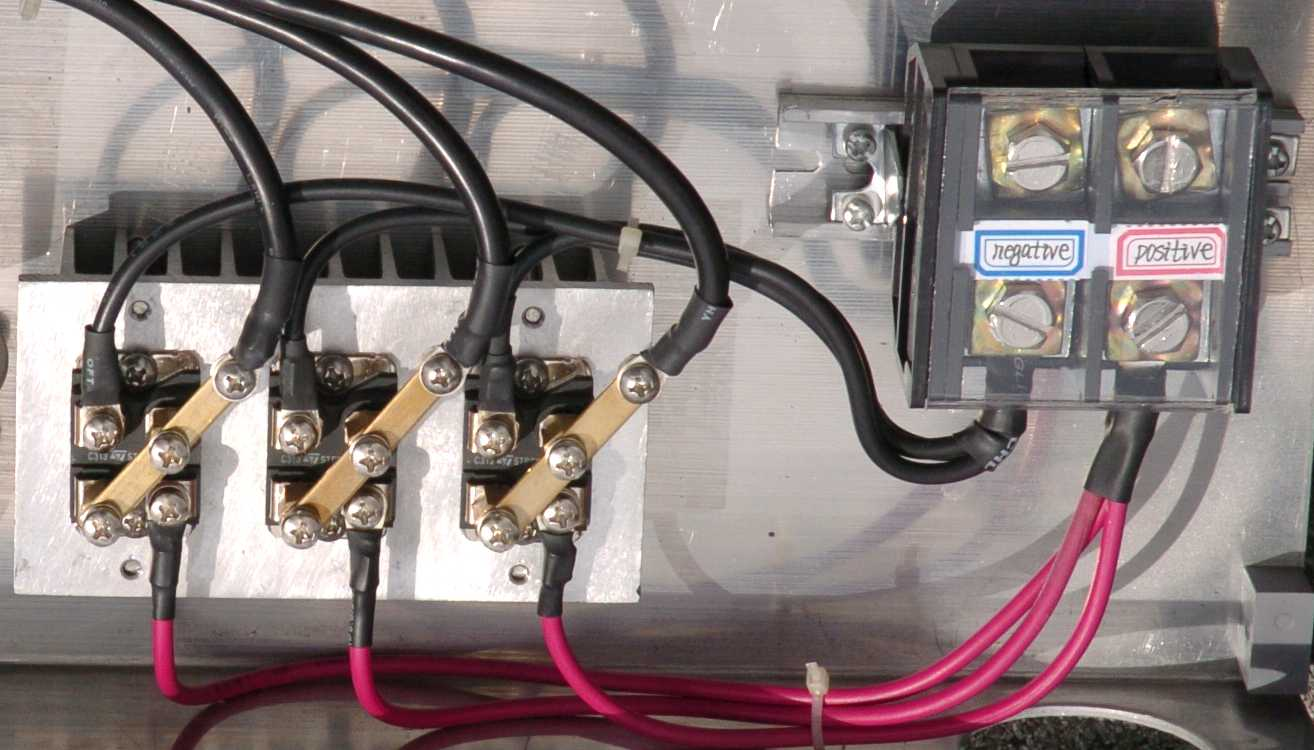
Three-phase bridge rectifier for a wind turbine

== See also ==
- 1N400x rectifier diodes
- Active rectification
- HVDC converter
