= Leo Graetz =

German physicist

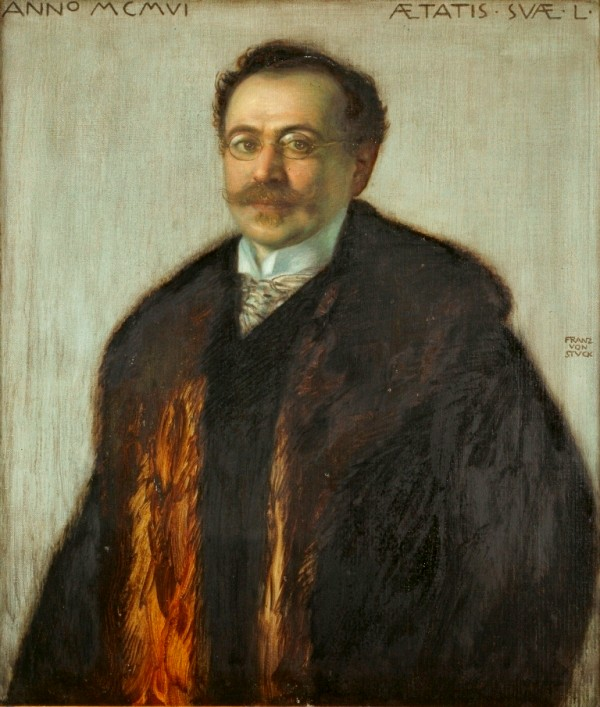
- Leo Graetz, painted by Franz von Stuck (1906)
- Born: 26 September 1856; Breslau, Prussia
- Died: 12 November 1941 (aged 85); Munich, Nazi Germany
- Known for: Graetz number, Diode bridge

Leo Graetz (26 September 1856 – 12 November 1941) was a German physicist. He was born in Breslau, Germany, and was the son of historian Heinrich Graetz.

Graetz was one of the first to investigate the propagation of electromagnetic energy. The Graetz number (Gz), a dimensionless number describing heat flow, is named after him. Also sometimes known by his name is the diode bridge rectifier circuit that was invented by Polish electrotechnician Karol Pollak in 1896 and that was independently invented and published by Leo Graetz in 1897.

In 1880 he confirmed the Stefan–Boltzmann law.

Graetz died in Munich at age 85.

== Publications ==
- Die Elektrizität und ihre Anwendungen (Electricity and Its Applications), Stuttgart 1903 Digital 17th edition from 1914 by the University and State Library Düsseldorf
- Handbuch der Elektrizität und des Magnetismus (Handbook of Electricity and Magnetism) - 5 volumes, 1918, 1921, 1923, 1920, 1928
- Recent developments in atomic theory, 1922
