= Ohnesorge number =

Number that relates the viscous forces to inertial and surface tension forces

The Ohnesorge number (Oh) is a dimensionless number that relates the viscous forces to inertial and surface tension forces. The number was defined by Wolfgang von Ohnesorge in his 1936 doctoral thesis.

It is defined as:

$$\mathrm{Oh} = \frac{ \mu}{ \sqrt{\rho \, \sigma \, L }} = \frac{\sqrt{\mathrm{We}}}{\mathrm{Re}} \sim \frac{\mbox{viscous forces}}{\sqrt{{\mbox{inertia}} \cdot {\mbox{surface tension}}}}$$

Where

- μ is the dynamic viscosity of the liquid
- ρ is the density of the liquid
- σ is the surface tension
- L is the characteristic length scale (typically drop diameter)
- Re is the Reynolds number
- We is the Weber number

== Applications ==
The Ohnesorge number for a 3 mm diameter rain drop is typically ~0.002. Larger Ohnesorge numbers indicate a greater influence of the viscosity.

This is often used to relate to free surface fluid dynamics such as dispersion of liquids in gases and in spray technology.

In inkjet printing, liquids whose Ohnesorge number are in the range 0.1 < Oh < 1.0 are jettable (1<Z<10 where Z is the reciprocal of the Ohnesorge number).

== See also ==
- Laplace number - There is an inverse relationship, $\mathrm{Oh} = 1/\sqrt{\mathrm{La}}$, between the Laplace number and the Ohnesorge number. It is more historically correct to use the Ohnesorge number, but often mathematically neater to use the Laplace number.
