= Splash (fluid mechanics) =

Sudden surface disturbance of quiet liquids

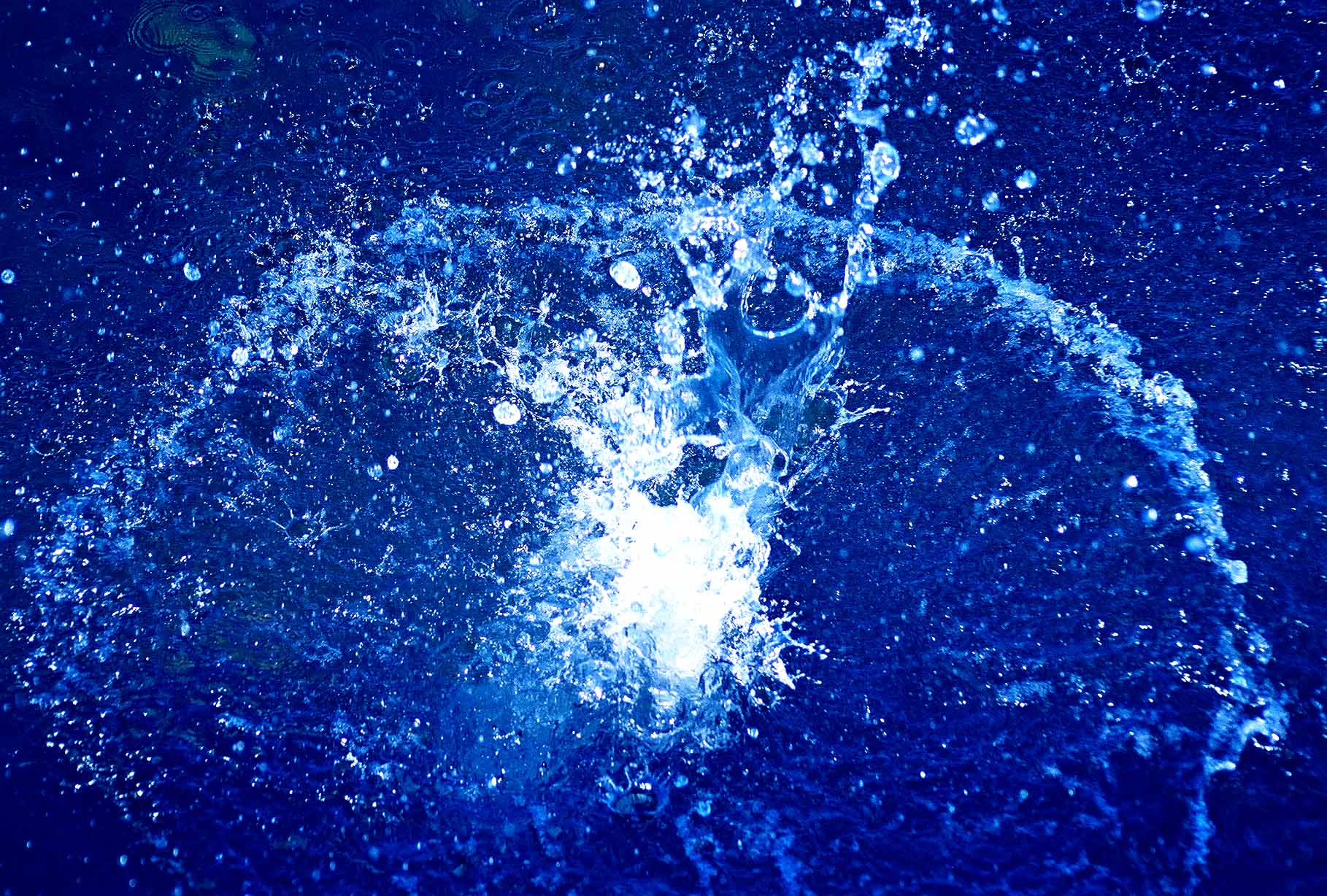
A splash after half a brick hits the water; the image is about half a metre across.

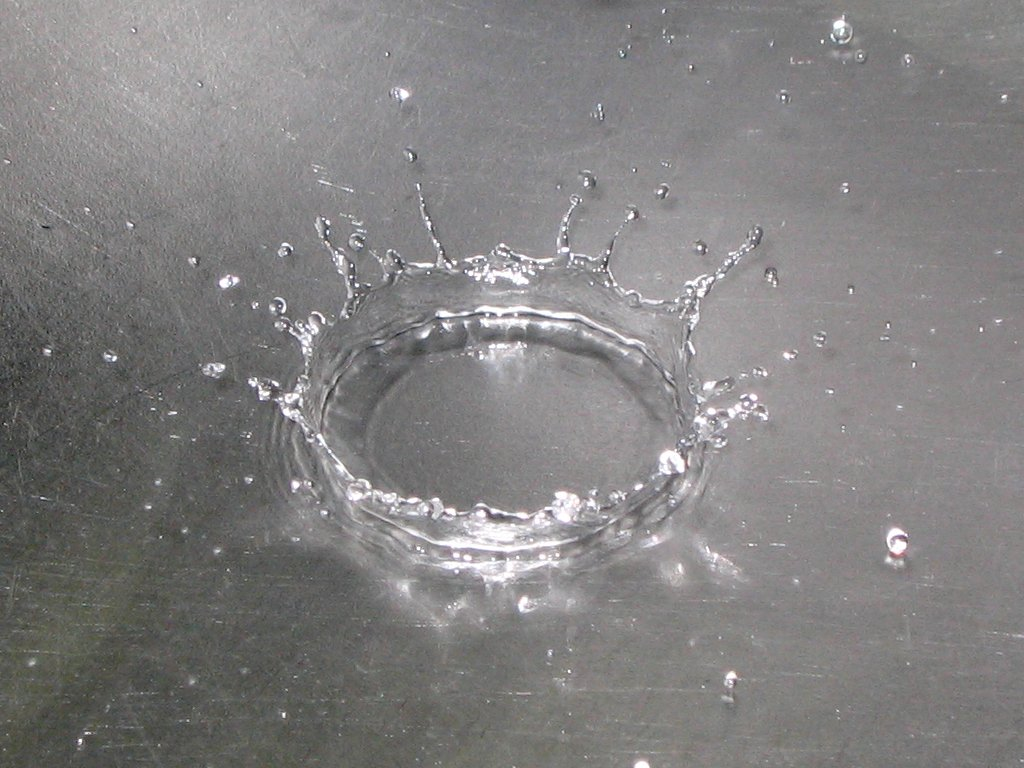
A drop of water splashing onto a hard surface

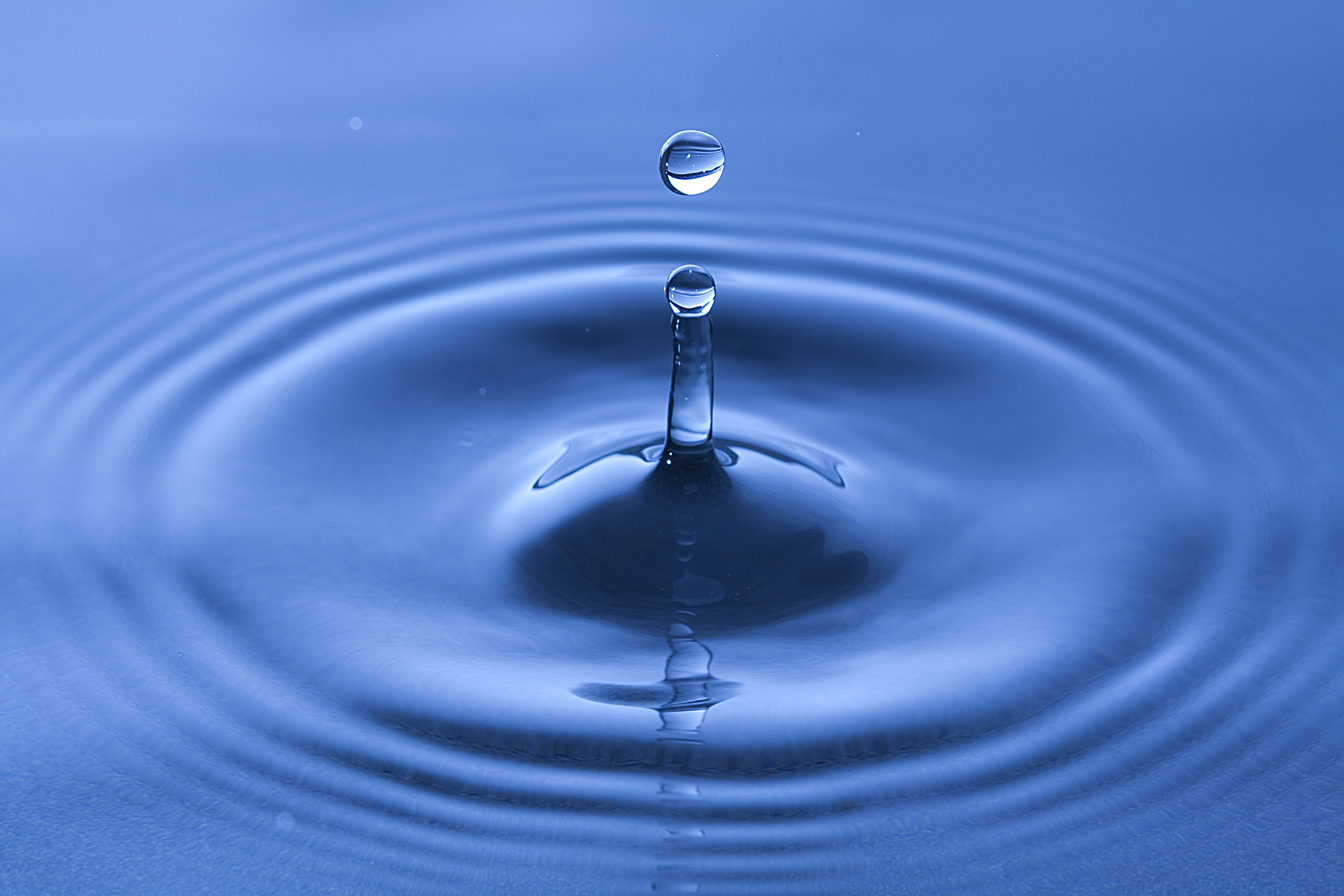
A drop of water splashing onto a water surface, showing the formation of a back-jet

Slow motion video of a fruit falling into water.

In fluid mechanics, a splash is a sudden disturbance to the otherwise quiescent free surface of a liquid (usually water). The disturbance is typically caused by a solid object suddenly hitting the surface, although splashes can occur in which moving liquid supplies the energy. This use of the word is onomatopoeic; in the past, the term "plash" has also been used.

Splash also happens when a liquid droplet impacts on a liquid or a solid surface; in this case, a symmetric corona (resembling a coronet) is usually formed as shown in Harold Edgerton's famous milk splash photography, as milk is opaque. Historically, Worthington (1908) was the first one who systematically investigated the splash dynamics using photographs.

Splashes are characterized by transient ballistic flow, and are governed by the Reynolds number and the Weber number. In the image of a brick splashing into water, one can identify freely moving airborne water droplets, a phenomenon typical of high Reynolds number flows; the intricate non-spherical shapes of the droplets show that the Weber number is high. Also seen are entrained air bubbles in the body of the water, and an expanding ring of disturbance propagating away from the impact site.

Sand is said to splash if hit sufficiently hard (see dry quicksand) and sometimes the impact of a meteorite is referred to as splashing, if small bits of ejecta are formed.

Physicist Lei Xu and coworkers at the University of Chicago discovered that the splash due to the impact of a small drop of ethanol onto a dry solid surface could be suppressed by reducing the pressure below a specific threshold. For drops of diameter 3.4 mm falling through air, this pressure was about 20 kilopascals, or 0.2 atmosphere.

A plate made of a hard material on which a stream of liquid is designed to fall is called a "splash plate". It may serve to protect the ground from erosion by falling water, such as beneath an artificial waterfall or water outlet in soft ground. Splash plates are also part of spray nozzles, such as in irrigation sprinkler systems.

== See also ==
- Drop impact
- Slosh, other free surface phenomenon
