= Ernst R. G. Eckert =

Ernst Eckert
- Born: September 13, 1904; Prague, Austria-Hungary
- Died: July 8, 2004 (aged 99); Saint Paul, Minnesota, United States
- Education: German Institute of Technology, Prague (1927) (Ph.D. - 1931)
- Known for: Eckert number
- Awards: ASME Max Jakob medal (1961); Fulbright Award (1962); ASME Thurston Lecture Award (1983); Founder’s Award of the National Academy of Engineering (1995)
- Scientific career
- Fields: Heat transfer, Mass transfer
- Workplaces: 1938 Aeronautical Research Institute (Braunschweig); 1945 Wright-Patterson Air Force Base; 1951 University of Minnesota (Regents Professor & professor emeritus)

Notes
- married Josefine Binder (1931)

Ernst Rudolph Georg Eckert (September 13, 1904 – July 8, 2004) was an Austrian American engineer and scientist who advanced the film cooling technique for aeronautical engines. He earned his Diplom Ingenieur and doctorate in 1927 and 1931, respectively, and habilitated in 1938. Eckert worked as a jet engine scientist at the Hermann Göring Aviation Research Institute near Braunschweig, Germany, then via Operation Paperclip, began jet propulsion research in 1945 at Wright-Patterson Air Force Base. In 1951, Eckert joined the University of Minnesota in the department of mechanical engineering. Eckert published over 550 scientific papers and books. The Eckert number in fluid dynamics was named after him.

In 1995 the National Academy of Engineering honored Eckert with its thirteenth Founders Award.

Eckert's son-in-law Horst Henning Winter, a specialist in rheology, is professor at UMass Amherst.
