= Wet gas =

A wet gas is any gas with a small amount of liquid present. The term "wet gas" has been used to describe a range of conditions varying from a humid gas which is gas saturated with liquid vapour to a multiphase flow with a 90% volume of gas. There has been some debate as to its actual definition, and there is currently no fully defined quantitative definition of a wet gas flow that is universally accepted.

Wet gas is a particularly important concept in the field of flow measurement, as the varying densities of the constituent material present a significant problem.

A typical example of wet gas flows are in the production of natural gas in the oil and gas industry. Natural gas is a mixture of hydrocarbon compounds with quantities of various non-hydrocarbons. This exists in either a gaseous or liquid phase or in solution with crude oil in porous rock formations. The number of hydrocarbons present in the liquid phase of the wet gas extracted depends on the reservoir temperature and pressure conditions, which change over time as the gas and liquid are removed. Changes in the liquid and gas content also occur when a wet gas is transported from a reservoir at high temperature and pressure to the surface where it experiences a lower temperature and pressure. The presence and changeability of this wet gas can cause problems and errors in the ability to accurately measure the gas phase flowrate.

It is important to be able to measure these wet gas flows accurately to quantify production from individual wells and to maximise the use of equipment and resources which will assist with the reduction of costs.

== Wet gas measurement terms ==
There are a number of specific terms used to describe the characteristics of wet gas flow:

Superficial gas velocity is the gas velocity if there were no liquid present in the wet gas flow. In wet gas flows the gas velocity is higher due to a reduction in the pipe area caused by the presence of the liquid.

Superficial liquid velocity is the liquid velocity if there were no gas present in the wet gas flow.

Liquid load is the ratio of the liquid mass flow rate to the gas mass flow rate and is normally expressed as a percentage.

GVF – Gas volume fraction is the ratio of the gas volumetric flow rate to the total volumetric flow rate.

LVF – Liquid volume fraction is the ratio of the liquid volumetric flow rate to the total volumetric flow rate.

Hold up is the cross sectional area occupied by the liquid in the pipe carrying the wet gas flow.

Void fraction is the ratio of the flow area occupied by the gas to the total flow area.

Lockhart–Martinelli parameter. Gas is compressible and the density changes significantly with changes in pressure. Liquids, on the other hand, are considered to be incompressible and so their density does not tend to change with a change in pressure. If the pressure of a wet gas system increases, the density of the gas will increase but the density of the liquid will not change. The densities of the flow components are an important consideration in flow measurement as they relate to the actual mass quantities of the fluids present. To account for both the flow rates and densities of the liquid and gas phases it is common practice to define the wetness or liquid loading of the gas using the Lockhart–Martinelli parameter, referred to as χ (Greek letter chi), which is a dimensionless number. This parameter can be calculated from the mass flow rate or volumetric flow rate and the density of the fluids. It is defined as:

$$\chi = \frac{m_\ell}{m_g} \sqrt{\frac{\rho_g}{\rho_\ell}},$$

where

- $m_\ell$ is the liquid phase mass flow rate;
- $m_g$ is the gas phase mass flow rate;
- $\rho_g$ is the gas density;
- $\rho_\ell$ is the liquid density.

This Lockhart–Martinelli parameter χ can be used to define a completely dry gas when the value is zero. A wet gas flow has a value of χ between zero and about 0.3 and values above 0.3 are usually defined as multiphase flows.

== Wet gas flow patterns ==
The behavior of the gases and liquid in a flowing pipe will exhibit various flow characteristics depending on the gas pressure, gas velocity and liquid content, as well as orientation of the piping (horizontal, sloping or vertical). The liquid may be in the form of tiny droplets or the pipe may be filled completely with liquid. Despite the complexity of gas and liquid interaction, attempts have been made to categorize this behavior. These gas and liquid interactions are commonly referred to as flow regimes or flow patterns.

Annular mist flow occurs at high gas velocities. A thin film of liquid is present around the annulus of the pipe. Typically most of the liquid is entrained in the form of droplets in the gas core. As a result of gravity, there is usually a thicker film of liquid on the bottom of the pipe as opposed to the top of the pipe.

Stratified (smooth) flow exists when the gravitational separation is complete. The liquid flows along the bottom of the pipe as gas flows over the top. Liquid holdup in this regime can be large but the gas velocities are low.

Stratified wave flow is similar to stratified smooth flow, but with a higher gas velocity. The higher gas velocity produces waves on the liquid surface. These waves may become large enough to break off liquid droplet at the peaks of the waves and become entrained in the gas. These droplets are distributed further down the pipe.

Slug flow is where large frothy waves of liquid form a slug that can fill the pipe completely. These slugs may also be in the form of a surge wave that exists upon a thick film of liquid on the bottom of the pipe.

Elongated bubble flow consists of a mostly liquid flow with elongated bubbles present closer to the top of the pipe.

Dispersed flow assume a pipe is completely filled with liquid with a small amount of entrained gas. The gas is in the form of smaller bubbles. These bubbles of gas have a tendency to reside in the top region of the pipe as gravity holds the liquid in the bottom of the pipe.

== Wet gas metering ==
There may be situations in which only the flow rate of the single key gas component is required, in this case single phase metering may be employed. The measurement can then be adjusted to compensate for the effect of the liquid on the meter. Some of the techniques available for measuring the liquid phase include:

A Test separator which determines the phase flow rates by physical separation of the liquid from the gas, with each phase then metered separately. This method provides information on all phases which can then be used to calculate the correction required for a meter and to check the gas flow through the meter. The pressure and temperature at the test separator should be the same as at the wet gas flow meter or the gas and liquid flow rates must be corrected for the conditions at the meter as phases could be different from those measured.

Sampling is where a sample of the wet gas is removed from the pipe line for analysis to determine the constituent components. It is important that a sample is collected that is representative of both the gas and liquid phase fractions and that there is no mass transfer between the phases during sampling.

Tracer method involves injecting a tracer dye into the wet gas flow and then sampling at a specific distance down stream to measure the dilution of the dye. The dilution of the dye in the liquid phase is used to calculate the liquid flow rate. This technique can be rather difficult to apply as it can be difficult gaining access to the correct points needed to conduct this test.

Microwave technology utilises the higher permittivity of water than hydrocarbons to detect the overall water fraction in the liquid and gas phases. As it only detects and measures the water component, the liquid hydrocarbon component must be measured by another method.

Overall pressure loss across different pressure meters using a Venturi tube to measure flow causes a pressure drop in the flow which is partly recovered downstream of the meter. In dry gas flows the recovery is greater than in wet gas flows due to the liquid component. This difference can be exploited to provide a measurement for the liquid fraction. This involves adding a second pressure tapping downstream of the Venturi to provide a measure of the partly recovered pressure drop. This method can be affected by changes in the system pressure and gas velocity.

Advanced signal processing is used where a liquid phase has an effect on the measurement signal such as pressure fluctuations in a DP flow meter or shift in the speed of sound in ultrasonic flow meter. Complex analysis and modelling of these signals can determine the liquid and gas flows.

There are a number of commercially available wet gas flow meters. Most of the meters use differential pressure for the gas phase and a form of liquid detection or wet gas density measurement for the liquid phase normally utilising one of the techniques listed above.

== See also ==
- Natural-gas condensate
- Hydrocarbon dew point
- Flow measurement
- Two-phase flow
- Multiphase flow
- Multiphase flow meter
- Fluid dynamics
