= William Reginald Dean =

British mathematician (1896–1973)

William Reginald Dean (1896–1973) was a British applied mathematician and fluid dynamicist. His research interests included Stokes flow, solid mechanics, and flow in curved channels. The Dean number bears his name.

Dean carried out pioneering work in the study of fluid flow at low Reynolds numbers, by applying methods from elasticity theory. Some of his more famous results include solutions for secondary flow in curved tubes, for the perturbation to shear flow near a wall caused by a gap in the wall, and for flow in a corner.

Dean was an undergraduate at Trinity College, Cambridge. He spent five years at Imperial College, and was later a fellow of Trinity College. During the war he undertook mathematical work as part of the Anti-Aircraft Experimental Section of M.I.D. He also held the Goldsmid Chair in Applied Mathematics at University College London (from which he retired in 1964), and a chair at the University of Arizona.
