= Graetz number =

Dimensionless parameter in fluid mechanics

In fluid dynamics, the Graetz number (Gz) is a dimensionless number that characterizes laminar flow in a conduit. The number is defined as:

$$\mathrm{Gz} = {D_H \over L} \mathrm{Re}\, \mathrm{Pr}$$

where

D_{H} is the diameter in round tubes or hydraulic diameter in arbitrary cross-section ducts
L is the length
Re is the Reynolds number and
Pr is the Prandtl number.

This number is useful in determining the thermally developing flow entrance length in ducts. A Graetz number of approximately 1000 or less is the point at which flow would be considered thermally fully developed.

When used in connection with mass transfer the Prandtl number is replaced by the Schmidt number, Sc, which expresses the ratio of the momentum diffusivity to the mass diffusivity.

$$\mathrm{Gz} = {D_H \over L} \mathrm{Re}\, \mathrm{Sc}$$

The quantity is named after the physicist Leo Graetz.
