= Blake number =

Dimensionless number in fluid dynamics

In fluid mechanics, the Blake number is a nondimensional number showing the ratio of inertial force to viscous force. It is used in momentum transfer in general and in particular for flow of a fluid through beds of solids. It is a generalisation of the Reynolds number for flow through porous media. It is named after the US chemist Frank C. Blake (1892–1926).

Expressed mathematically the Blake number B is:

$$B = \frac{u \rho D_h}{\mu ( 1-\epsilon)}$$

where

ε	=	void fraction
μ	=	dynamic viscosity
ρ	=	fluid density
D_{h}	=	hydraulic diameter
u	=	flow velocity
