= Moritz Weber =

German university professor and engineer (1871-1951)

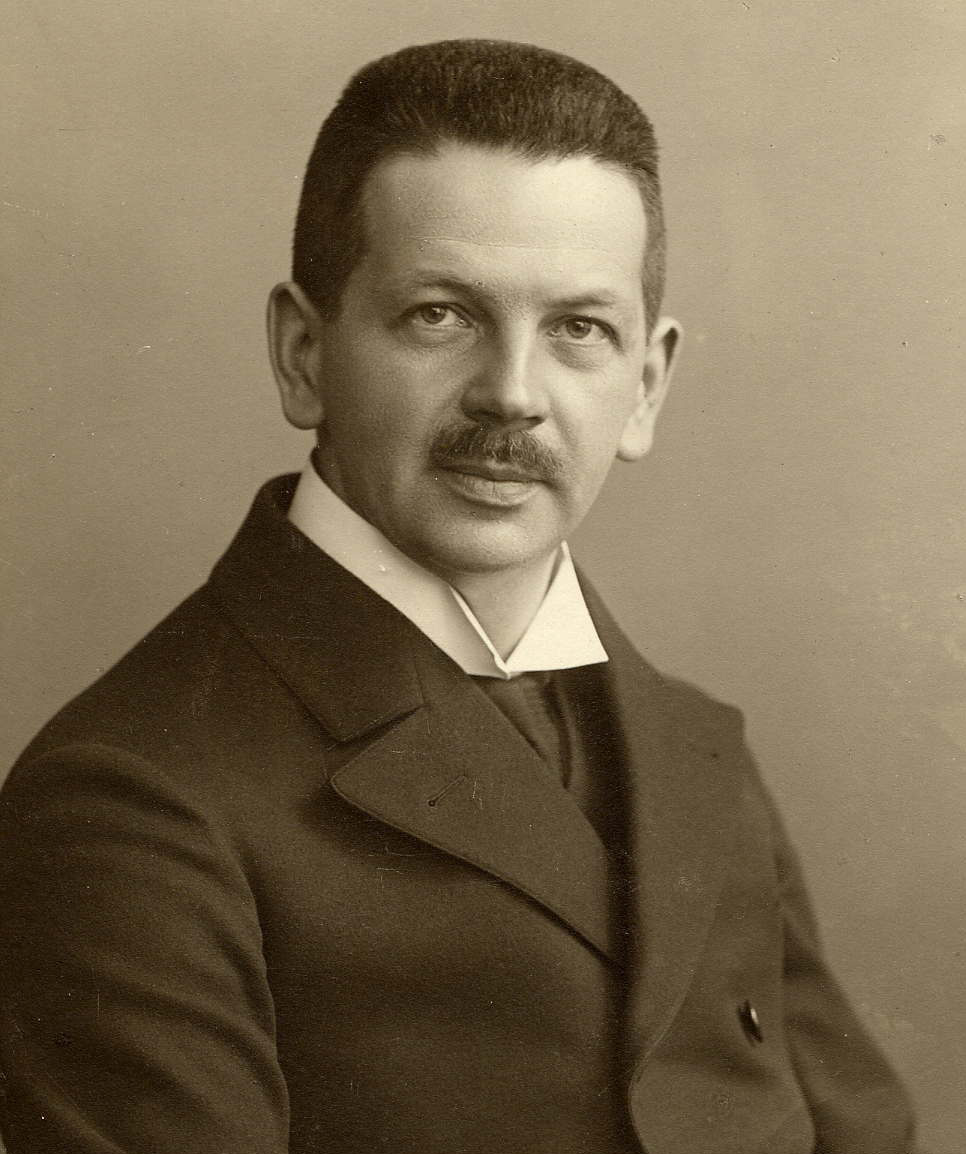
- Born: 1871
- Died: 1951 (aged 79–80)
- Known for: Reynolds number, Froude number

Moritz Weber (1871–1951), was a professor of naval mechanics at Technische Hochschule Charlottenburg (today Technische Universität Berlin). The dimensionless numbers Reynolds number (named after the British scientist and mathematician Osborne Reynolds), and Froude number (named after the British engineer William Froude) was coined by Moritz Weber. Moreover, the dimensionless number Weber number was coined after him. Weber was also responsible in coining the term similitude to describe model studies that were scaled both geometrically and using dimensionless parameters for forces.
