= Scruton number =

Dimensionless number in fluid mechanics

The Scruton number (Sc) is an important parameter for vortex-induced vibration (excitation) of structures, vibrations caused by rain or wind, dry inclined cable galloping, and wake galloping, the unstable airflow that forms around bridge cables and other cylindrically-structured buildings. It is named after Christopher "Kit" Scruton, a British industrial dynamics engineer.

It is defined by:

$$\mathrm{Sc} = \frac{2\delta_sm_e}{\rho b^2_\text{ref}},$$

where

$\delta_s$	is the structural damping expressed by the logarithmic damping decrement,
$m_e$	is the effective mass per unit length,
$\rho$	is the density of the air, or liquid,
$b_\text{ref}$	is the characteristic width of the structure.
