= Galilei number =

Dimensionless constant in fluid mechanics

In fluid dynamics, the Galilei number (Ga), sometimes also referred to as Galileo number, is a dimensionless number named after Italian scientist Galileo Galilei (1564-1642).

It may be regarded as proportional to gravity forces divided by viscous forces. The Galilei number is used in viscous flow and thermal expansion calculations, for example to describe fluid film flow over walls. These flows apply to condensers or chemical columns.

$$\mathrm{Ga} = \frac{g\, L^3}{\nu^2}$$

- g: gravitational acceleration, (SI units: m/s^{2})
- L: characteristic length, (SI units: m)
- ν: characteristic kinematic viscosity, (SI units: m^{2}/s)

== See also ==
- Archimedes number
