= Lockhart–Martinelli parameter =

Dimensionless parameter in fluid mechanics

The Lockhart–Martinelli parameter ($\chi$) is a dimensionless number used in internal two-phase flow calculations. It expresses the liquid fraction of a flowing fluid. Its main application is in two-phase pressure drop and boiling/condensing heat transfer calculations. It was first used by R. W. Lockhart and Raymond C. Martinelli in 1949.

It is defined as:

$$\chi = \frac{m_\ell}{m_g} \sqrt{\frac{\rho_g}{\rho_\ell}},$$

where

- $m_\ell$ is the liquid phase mass flowrate;
- $m_g$ is the gas phase mass flowrate;
- $\rho_g$ is the gas density;
- $\rho_\ell$ is the liquid density.

== See also ==
- Wet gas
