= Dean number =

Dimensionless group in fluid mechanics

The Dean number (De) is a dimensionless group in fluid mechanics, which occurs in the study of flow in curved pipes and channels. It is named after the British scientist W. R. Dean, who was the first to provide a theoretical solution of the fluid motion through curved pipes for laminar flow by using a perturbation procedure from a Poiseuille flow in a straight pipe to a flow in a pipe with very small curvature.

== Physical context ==
Schematic of a pair of Dean vortices that form in curved pipes.

If a fluid is moving along a straight pipe that after some point becomes curved, then the flow entering a curved portion develops a centrifugal force in an asymmetrical geometry. Such asymmetricity affects the parabolic velocity profile and causes a shift in the location of the maximum velocity compared to a straight pipe. Therefore, the maximum velocity shifts from the centerline towards the concave outer wall and forms an asymmetric velocity profile. There will be an adverse pressure gradient generated from the curvature with an increase in pressure, therefore a decrease in velocity close to the convex wall, and the contrary occurring towards the concave outer wall of the pipe. This gives rise to a secondary motion superposed on the primary flow, with the fluid in the centre of the pipe being swept towards the outer side of the bend and the fluid near the pipe wall will return towards the inside of the bend. This secondary motion is expected to appear as a pair of counter-rotating cells, which are called Dean vortices.

== Definition ==
The Dean number is typically denoted by De (or Dn). For a flow in a pipe or tube it is defined as:

$$\mathrm{De}
= \frac{\sqrt{\frac{1}{2}\,(\text{inertial forces})(\text{centrifugal forces})}}{\text{viscous forces}}
= \frac{\sqrt{\frac{1}{2}\,(\rho\,D^2\,R_c\,\frac{v^2}{D}) (\rho\,D^2\,R_c\,\frac{v^2}{R_c})}}{\mu \frac{v}{D} D\,R_c}
= \frac{\rho\,D\,v}{\mu} \sqrt{ \frac{D}{2\,R_c} }
= \textrm{Re} \, \sqrt{ \frac{D}{2\,R_c} }$$

where

- $\rho$ is the density of the fluid
- $\mu$ is the dynamic viscosity
- $v$ is the axial velocity scale
- $D$ is the diameter (for non-circular geometry, an equivalent diameter is used; see Reynolds number)
- $R_c$ is the radius of curvature of the path of the channel.
- $\textrm{Re}$ is the Reynolds number.

The Dean number is therefore the product of the Reynolds number (based on axial flow $v$ through a pipe of diameter $D$) and the square root of the curvature ratio.

== Turbulence transition ==
The flow is completely unidirectional for low Dean numbers (De < 40~60). As the Dean number increases between 40~60 to 64~75, some wavy perturbations can be observed in the cross-section, which evidences some secondary flow. At higher Dean numbers than that (De > 64~75) the pair of Dean vortices becomes stable, indicating a primary dynamic instability. A secondary instability appears for De > 75~200, where the vortices present undulations, twisting, and eventually merging and pair splitting. Fully turbulent flow forms for De > 400. Transition from laminar to turbulent flow has also been examined in a number of studies, even though no universal solution exists since the parameter is highly dependent on the curvature ratio. Somewhat unexpectedly, laminar flow can be maintained for larger Reynolds numbers (even by a factor of two for the highest curvature ratios studied) than for straight pipes, even though curvature is known to cause instability.

De	Flow conditions
< 40~60	Unidirectional
64~75	Some secondary flow
75~200	Stable Dean vortices
200~400	Secondary instabilities
> 400	Fully turbulent

== Dean equations ==
The Dean number appears in the so-called Dean equations. These are an approximation to the full Navier–Stokes equations for the steady axially uniform flow of a Newtonian fluid in a toroidal pipe, obtained by retaining just the leading order curvature effects (i.e. the leading-order equations for $a/r \ll 1$).

We use orthogonal coordinates $(x,y,z)$ with corresponding unit vectors $(\hat{\boldsymbol{x}},\hat{\boldsymbol{y}},\hat{\boldsymbol{z}})$ aligned with the centre-line of the pipe at each point. The axial direction is $\hat{\boldsymbol{z}}$, with $\hat{\boldsymbol{x}}$ being the normal in the plane of the centre-line, and $\hat{\boldsymbol{y}}$ the binormal. For an axial flow driven by a pressure gradient $G$, the axial velocity $u_z$ is scaled with $U=Ga^2/\mu$. The cross-stream velocities $u_x, u_y$ are scaled with $(a/R)^{1/2} U$, and cross-stream pressures with $\rho a U^2/L$. Lengths are scaled with the tube radius $a$.

In terms of these non-dimensional variables and coordinates, the Dean equations are then

$$\mathrm{De} \left( \frac{\mathrm{D} u_x}{\mathrm{D} t} - u_z^2 \right) = -\mathrm{De}\frac{\partial p}{\partial x} + \nabla^2 u_x$$
$$\mathrm{De} \frac{\mathrm{D} u_y}{\mathrm{D} t} = -\mathrm{De} \frac{\partial p}{\partial y} + \nabla^2 u_y$$
$$\mathrm{De} \frac{\mathrm{D} u_z}{\mathrm{D} t} = 1  + \nabla^2 u_z$$
$$\frac{\partial u_x}{\partial x} + \frac{\partial u_y}{\partial y} = 0$$

where

$$\frac{\mathrm{D}}{\mathrm{D} t} = u_x \frac{\partial}{\partial x} + u_y \frac{\partial}{\partial y}$$

is the convective derivative.

The Dean number De is the only parameter left in the system, and encapsulates the leading order curvature effects. Higher-order approximations will involve additional parameters.

For weak curvature effects (small De), the Dean equations can be solved as a series expansion in De. The first correction to the leading-order axial Poiseuille flow is a pair of vortices in the cross-section carrying flow from the inside to the outside of the bend across the centre and back around the edges. This solution is stable up to a critical Dean number $\mathrm{De}_c \approx 956$. For larger De, there are multiple solutions, many of which are unstable.
