= Karol Pollak =

Polish electrical engineer (1859–1928)

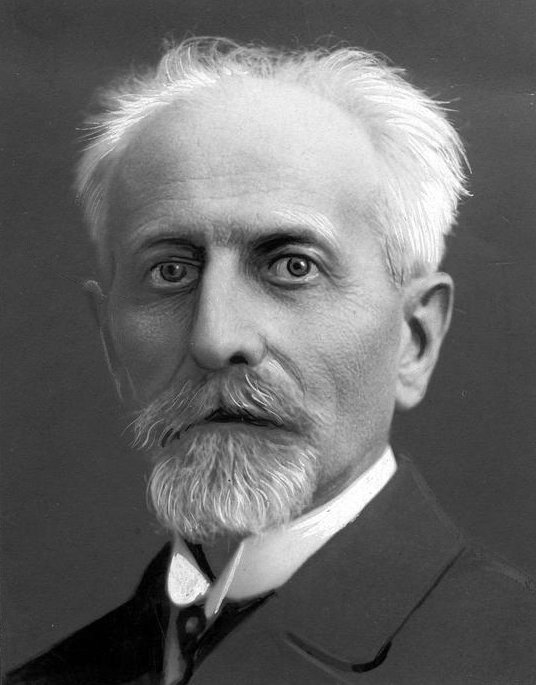
- Karol Pollak, Polish Edison, 1920s
- Born: Karol Franciszek Pollak; 15 November 1859; Sanok, Kingdom of Galicia and Lodomeria, then part of Austrian Empire, today in Poland
- Died: 17 December 1928 (aged 69); Bielsko-Biała, Poland
- Education: Royal Polytechnic University in Charlottenburg
- Occupations: Inventor, businessman
- Known for: diode bridge electrolytic capacitor

Karol Franciszek Pollak (15 November 1859 – 17 December 1928) was a Polish electrical engineer, inventor and businessman. He is known for his contributions to the development of electrolytic capacitor and diode bridge.

== Early life ==
Karol Pollak was born in Sanok, Kingdom of Galicia and Lodomeria, part of the Austrian Empire. His father was Karol Pollak (1818–80), who was a printer, bookseller and publisher. The younger Karol worked as an electrician in his youth and showed great technical skills in it. In 1883, he was employed in the laboratory of British company, The Patent Utilisation Co. He designed and recorded his first patents during this period. In 1885 he studied electrical engineering at the Royal Polytechnic University in Charlottenburg.

== Activity ==
In Berlin, Pollak ran the electrical equipment factory G. Wehr Telegraphen-Bau-Anstalt. Later he returned to Britain to commercialize his patents, which were released under the anglicised version of his name, Charles Pollak. In 1886, he became the director of a Paris company of electric tramways of his design. In the meantime he worked on the design of the electrochemical cell. He was very successful in this and became well known for it. Later he founded battery factories in Frankfurt, (Germany) and Liesing, Austria. Many battery manufacturers have licensed his designs.

In 1899 he founded his own laboratory and proceeded with further research. He obtained 98 patents on his inventions.

In 1922 he returned to Poland, where a year later he founded a factory in Biała, which exists to the present day. The company started under the name of Polskie Towarzystwo Akumulatorowe and was co-founded by professor and the president of Poland, Ignacy Mościcki. However, Pollak was the first president of this company.

Pollak is sometimes referred to as the Edison of Poland. In 1925 he received the title Doctor Honoris Causa from Warsaw University of Technology.

== Most important inventions ==
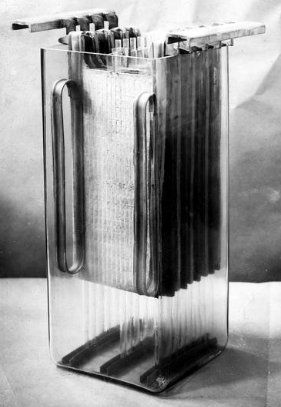
Battery constructed by Karol Pollak

His numerous inventions also cover other areas, among them: electric motors, a color printing device, and a type of microphone. His main activity was related to chemical sources of energy – galvanic cells and batteries. He obtained a patent for manufacturing lead-acid batteries.

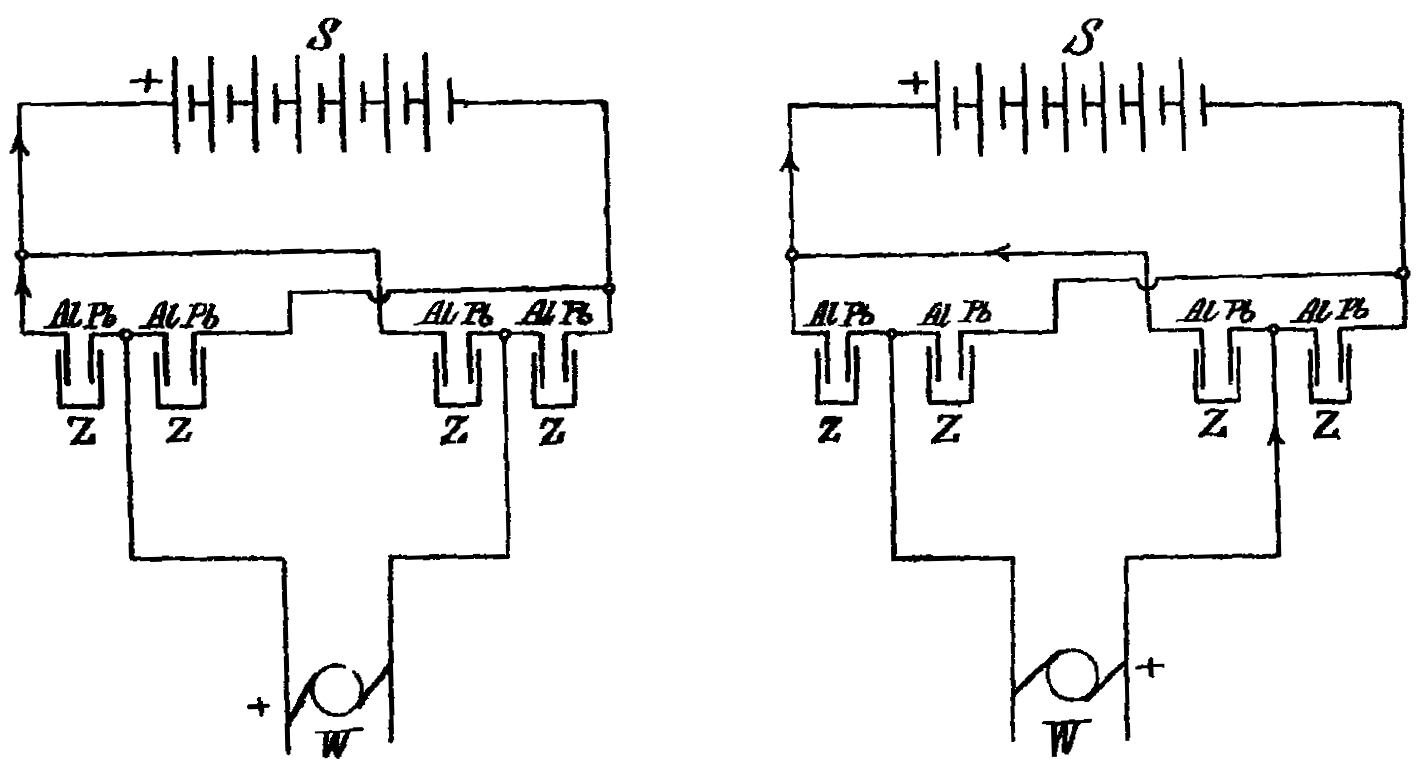
Design of full rectifier included in Karol Pollak patent

Pollak also designed commutator and electrolytic rectifiers. In 1895 he was the first to suggest the use of full bridge diode rectification circuits. In 1896, Pollak invented the electrolytic capacitor.

== Bibliography ==
- Encyklopedia. Vol. 2. Warszawa: PWN. 1991.
- Kubiatowski, Jerzy (1984). Słownik polskich pionierów techniki. Katowice. pp. 166–167.
