= Rose Morton =

American mathematician

Rose Katherine Morton-Sayre (December 3, 1925 – November 12, 1999) was an American mathematician known for her work in fluid mechanics. The Morton number, a dimensionless parameter used to describe bubbles, is named after her.

Morton was born in Albemarle, North Carolina. She graduated from the University of North Carolina at Greensboro (at that time a women's college) with a bachelor's degree in mathematics in 1948; at the university, she was president of the Square Circle Club. She worked at the David Taylor Model Basin, a test facility for the U. S. Navy, from 1949 to 1960.

Her husband was mechanical engineer Clifford L. Sayre, Jr., who also worked at the David Taylor Model Basin from 1956 to 1960.

== Selected publications ==
- Haberman, W. L.; Morton, R. K. (1953), An experimental investigation of the drag and shape of air bubbles rising in various liquids, Report 802, Navy Department: The David W. Taylor Model Basin
- Haberman, W. L.; Sayre, R. M. (1953), Motion of rigid and fluid spheres in stationary and moving liquids inside cylindrical tubes, Report 1143, Navy Department: The David W. Taylor Model Basin
