= Max Jakob =

German physicist

Max Jakob (20 July 1879 – 4 January 1955) was a German physicist known for his work in the field of thermal science.

Born in Ludwigshafen, Germany, Jakob studied engineering at the Technical University of Munich, from which he graduated in 1903. From 1903 to 1906, he was an assistant to O. Knoblauch at the Laboratory for Technical Physics. In 1910, Jakob embarked on a 25-year career at the Physikalisch-Technische Reichsanstalt in Charlottenburg, Berlin. During this time he founded and directed applied thermodynamics, heat transfer, and fluid flow laboratories.

Fleeing Nazi persecution, Jakob left Germany in 1936 and immigrated to the United States, where he became a professor at Armour Institute of Technology (now Illinois Institute of Technology) and a consultant in heat transfer for Armour Research Foundation. There he conducted research, covering areas such as steam and air at high pressure, devices for measuring thermal conductivity, the mechanisms of boiling and condensation, and flow in pipes and nozzles.

His many years of teaching, consulting, and writing resulted in contributions to the literature of the profession; nearly 500 books, articles, reviews and discussions have been published based on his research. He has published a number of books in thermal sciences including Elements of Heat Transfer and Insulation (1942) and Heat Transfer (1956).

He is credited with devising the Jakob dimensionless number, aka Jakob number, which is used in phase change heat transfer calculations:

$Ja=\frac{c_{p,f}(T_w - T_{sat})}{h_{fg}}$

The Max Jakob Memorial Award, the highest honor in the field of heat transfer, was established in 1961 by the American Society of Mechanical Engineers (ASME) Heat Transfer Division in honor of Jakob.
