= Capillary number =

Ratio of viscous drag forces to surface tension in fluids

In fluid dynamics, the capillary number (Ca) is a dimensionless quantity representing the relative effect of viscous drag forces versus surface tension forces acting across an interface between a liquid and a gas, or between two immiscible liquids. Alongside the Bond number, commonly denoted $\mathrm{Bo}$, this term is useful to describe the forces acting on a fluid front in porous or granular media, such as soil. The capillary number is defined as:

$$\mathrm{Ca} = \frac{\mu V}{\sigma}$$

where $\mu$ is the dynamic viscosity of the liquid, $V$ is a characteristic velocity and $\sigma$ is the surface tension or interfacial tension between the two fluid phases.

Being a dimensionless quantity, the capillary number's value does not depend on the system of units. In the petroleum industry, capillary number is denoted $N_c$ instead of $\mathrm{Ca}$.

For low capillary numbers (a rule of thumb says less than 10^{−5}), flow in porous media is dominated by capillary forces, whereas for high capillary numbers the capillary forces are negligible compared to the viscous forces. Flow through the pores in an oil reservoir has capillary number values in the order of 10^{−6}, whereas flow of oil through an oil well drill pipe has a capillary number in the order of unity.

The capillary number plays a role in the dynamics of capillary flow; in particular, it governs the dynamic contact angle of a flowing droplet at an interface.

== Multiphase formulation ==
Multiphase flows forms when two or more partially or immiscible fluids are brought in contact. The capillary number in multiphase flow has the same definition as the single flow formulation, the ratio of viscous to surface forces but has the added(?) effect of the ratio of fluid viscosities:

$\mathrm{Ca} = \frac{\mu V}{\sigma}, \frac{\mu }{\hat{\mu}}$

where $\mu$ and $\hat{\mu}$ are the viscosity of the continuous and the dispersed phases respectively.

Multiphase microflows are characterized by the ratio of viscous to surface forces, the capillary number (Ca), and by the ratio of fluid viscosities:

$\mathrm{Ca} = \frac{\mu V}{\sigma}$ and $\frac{\mu }{\hat{\mu}}.$

== See also ==
- Bond number
- Reynolds number
- Capillary pressure
- Froude number
