= Wilfrid Noel Bond =

English physicist (1897–1937)

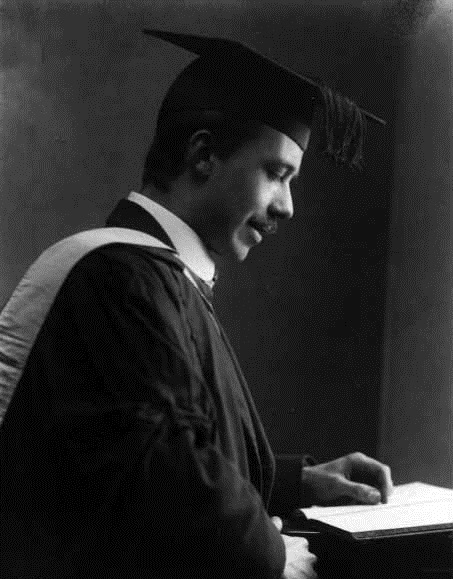
- Bond c. 1920
- Born: 27 December 1897; St Albans, Hertfordshire, England
- Died: 25 August 1937 (aged 39); Minehead, Somerset
- Known for: Bond number
- Scientific career
- Fields: Fluid mechanics

Wilfrid Noel Bond (27 December 1897 – 25 August 1937) was an English physicist and engineer known for his work in fluid mechanics. He received his Doctor of Science from the University of London, and was a lecturer at the University of Reading from 1921 until his death. The Bond number, used in fluid mechanics to characterize the shape of bubbles and drops, is named after him.

Bond is also known for having described, in 1922, an improvement to the first fisheye lens setup, previously proposed by Robert W. Wood in 1908. Consisting of an hemispherical lens glass in a pinhole setup, it offered a much simpler and portable setup than its predecessor (which relied on a rectilinear lens installed inside a sealed tank of water) and reduced exposure times. The focal length depended on the refractive index and radius of the hemispherical lens, and the maximum aperture was approximately f/50; it was not corrected for chromatic aberration and projected a curved field onto a flat plate. Bond noted the new lens could be used to record cloud cover or lightning strikes at a given location.

== Bibliography ==
- An Introduction to Fluid Motion (1925)
- Numerical Examples in Physics (1931)
- Probability and Random Errors (1935)
