= Eötvös number =

Dimensionless number in fluid dynamics

In fluid dynamics the Eötvös number (Eo), also called the Bond number (Bo), is a dimensionless number measuring the importance of gravitational forces compared to surface tension forces for the movement of liquid front. Alongside the capillary number, commonly denoted $\mathrm{Ca}$, which represents the contribution of viscous drag, $\mathrm{Bo}$ is useful for studying the movement of fluid in porous or granular media, such as soil. The Bond number (or Eötvös number) is also used (together with Morton number) to characterize the shape of bubbles or drops moving in a surrounding fluid. The two names used for this dimensionless term commemorate the Hungarian physicist Loránd Eötvös and the English physicist Wilfrid Noel Bond, respectively. The term Eötvös number is more frequently used in Europe, while Bond number is commonly used in other parts of the world.

== Definition ==
Describing the ratio of gravitational to capillary forces, the Eötvös or Bond number is given by the equation:
$$\mathrm{Eo} = \mathrm{Bo} = \frac{\Delta\rho \,g \,L^2}{\gamma}.$$

- $\Delta\rho$: difference in density of the two phases, (SI units: kg/m^{3})
- g: gravitational acceleration, (SI units : m/s^{2})
- L: characteristic length, (SI units : m) (for example the radii of curvature for a drop)
- $\gamma$: surface tension, (SI units : N/m)

The Bond number can also be written as
$$\mathrm{Bo}=\left(\frac{L}{\lambda_{\rm c}}\right)^2 ,$$
where $\lambda_{\rm c}=\sqrt{{\gamma}/{\rho g}}$ is the capillary length.

A high value of the Eötvös or Bond number indicates that the system is relatively unaffected by surface tension effects; a low value (typically less than one) indicates that surface tension dominates. Intermediate numbers indicate a non-trivial balance between the two effects. It may be derived in a number of ways, such as scaling the pressure of a drop of liquid on a solid surface. It is usually important, however, to find the right length scale specific to a problem by doing a ground-up scale analysis.

Other similar dimensionless numbers are:

$$\mathrm{Bo} = \mathrm{Eo} = 2\, \mathrm{Go}^2 = 2\, \mathrm{De}^2$$

where Go and De are the Goucher and Derjaguin numbers, which are identical: the Goucher number, named after Canadian scientist Frederick Shand Goucher (1888–1973), arises in wire coating problems and hence uses a radius as a typical length scale while the Derjaguin or Deryagin number, named after Boris Derjaguin, arises in plate film thickness problems and hence uses a Cartesian length.

In order to consider all three of the forces that act on a moving fluid front in the presence of a gas (or other fluid) phase, namely viscous, capillary and gravitational forces, the generalized Bond number, which is denoted commonly as Bo^{*}, can be used. This is defined as:

$$\mathrm{Bo^*} = \mathrm{Bo}-\mathrm{Ca}.$$

== Walking on water ==
The Bond number can be thought as the ratio of the weight of an object and the surface tension, as
$$\mathrm{Bo}=\frac{Mg}{\gamma L } ,$$
where M is the mass of the object and L its contact perimeter length. An object or an insect can float on water due to surface tension if $\mathrm{Bo} < 1$ (or conversely $\mathrm{Bo}^{-1} > 1$). This principle allows for animal locomotion on the surface of water.

Some textbooks refer to the inverse Bond number as the Jesus number ($\mathrm{Je}$) in reference to Biblical Jesus walking on water.
