= Eckert number =

Dimensionless number in fluid mechanics

The Eckert number (Ec) is a dimensionless number used in continuum mechanics. It expresses the relationship between a flow's kinetic energy and the boundary layer enthalpy difference, and is used to characterize heat transfer dissipation. It is named after Ernst R. G. Eckert.

It is defined as

$$\mathrm{Ec} = \frac{u^2}{c_p \Delta T} = \frac{ \mbox{Advective  Transport} }{ \mbox{Heat  Dissipation  Potential}}$$

where

- u is the local flow velocity of the continuum,
- c_{p} is the constant-pressure local specific heat of the continuum,
- $\Delta T$ is the difference between wall temperature and local temperature.
