= Hagen number =

Mathematical concept

The Hagen number (Hg) is a dimensionless number used in forced flow calculations. It is the forced flow equivalent of the Grashof number and was named after the German hydraulic engineer G. H. L. Hagen.

== Definition ==
It is defined as:

$$\mathrm{Hg} = -\frac{1}{\rho}\frac{\mathrm{d} p}{\mathrm{d} x}\frac{L^3}{\nu^2}$$

where:

- $\frac{\mathrm{d}p}{\mathrm{d}x}$ is the pressure gradient
- L is a characteristic length
- ρ is the fluid density
- ν is the kinematic viscosity

For natural convection

$$\frac{\mathrm{d} p}{\mathrm{d} x} = \rho g \beta \Delta T,$$

and so the Hagen number then coincides with the Grashof number.

== Hagen number vs. Bejan number ==
Awad: presented Hagen number vs. Bejan number. Although their physical meaning is not the same because the former represents the dimensionless pressure gradient while the latter represents the dimensionless pressure drop, it will be shown that Hagen number coincides with Bejan number in cases where the characteristic length (l) is equal to the flow length (L). Also, a new expression of Bejan number in the Hagen-Poiseuille flow will be introduced. In addition, extending the Hagen number to a general form will be presented. For the case of Reynolds analogy (Pr = Sc = 1), all these three definitions of Hagen number will be the same. The general form of the Hagen number is

$$\mathrm{Hg} = -\frac{1}{\rho}\frac{\mathrm{d} p}{\mathrm{d} x}\frac{L^3}{\delta^2}$$

where

$\delta$ is the corresponding diffusivity of the process in consideration
