= Weber number =

Dimensionless number in fluid mechanics

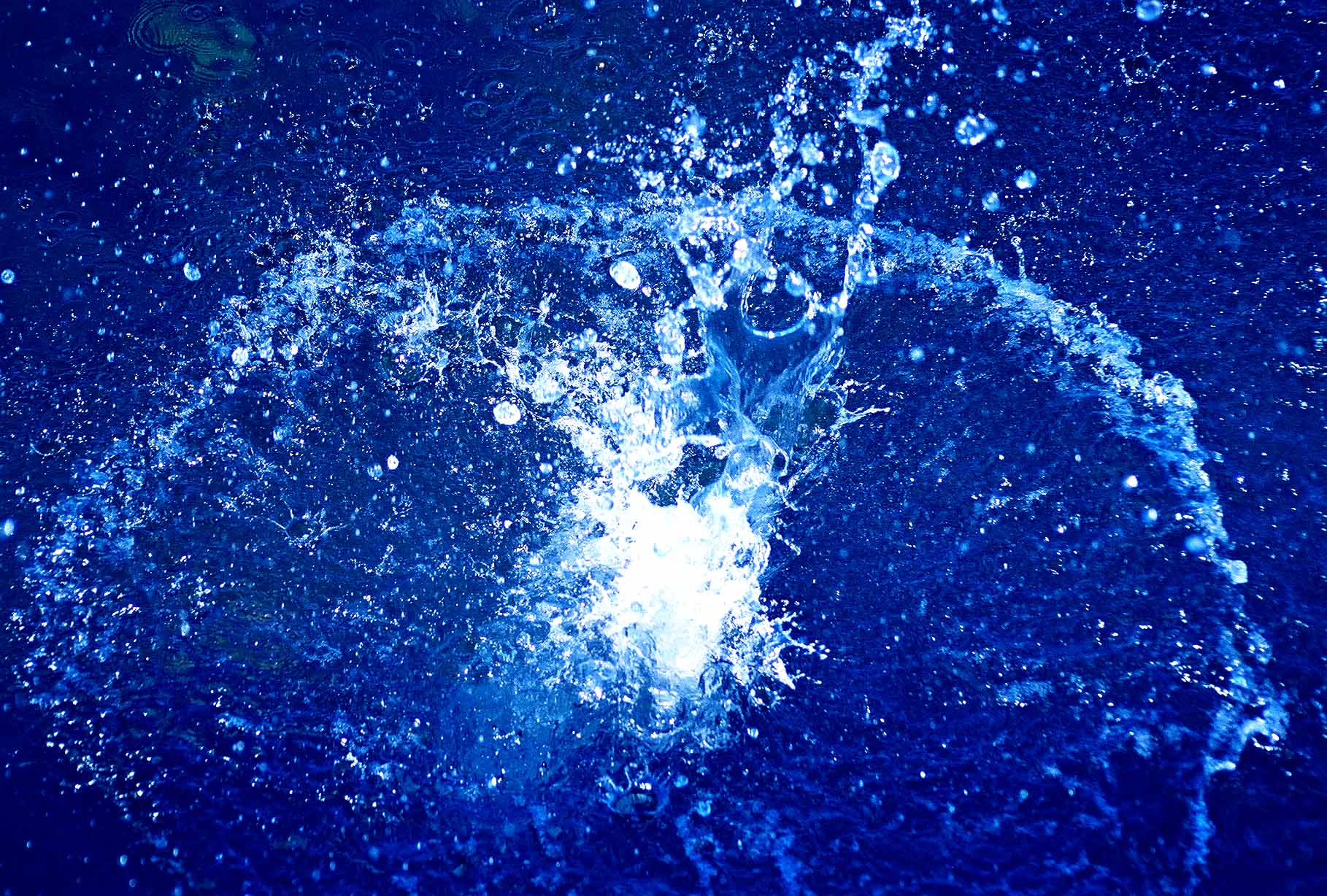
A splash after half a brick hits the water; the image is about half a meter across. Note the freely moving airborne water droplets, a phenomenon typical of high Reynolds number flows; the intricate non-spherical shapes of the droplets show that the Weber number is high. Also note the entrained bubbles in the body of the water, and an expanding ring of disturbance propagating away from the impact site.

The Weber number (We) is a dimensionless number in fluid mechanics that is often useful in analysing fluid flows where there is an interface between two different fluids, especially for multiphase flows with strongly curved surfaces. It is named after Moritz Weber (1871–1951). It can be thought of as a measure of the relative importance of the fluid's inertia compared to its surface tension. The quantity is useful in analyzing thin film flows and the formation of droplets and bubbles.

== Mathematical expression ==
The Weber number may be written as:

$\mathrm{We} = \frac{\mbox{Inertial pressure}}{\mbox{Laplace pressure}} = \frac{\rho\,v^2}{ \left(\sigma/l\right)} = \frac{\rho\,v^2\,l}{\sigma}$

where

- $\rho$ is the density of the fluid (kg/m^{3}).
- $v$ is its velocity (m/s).
- $l$ is its characteristic length, typically the droplet diameter (m).
- $\sigma$ is the surface tension (N/m).
- $\rho\,v^2$ is the inertial or dynamic pressure scale.
- $\sigma/l$ is the Laplace pressure scale.

The above is the force perspective to define the Weber number. We can also define it using energy perspective as the ratio of the kinetic energy on impact to the surface energy,

$$\mathrm{We}=\frac{E_\mathrm{kin}}{E_\mathrm{surf}}$$,

where

$E_\mathrm{kin} \propto \rho l^3 v^2$

and

$$E_\mathrm{surf}\propto l^2 \sigma$$.

=== Appearance in the Navier-Stokes equations ===
The Weber number appears in the incompressible Navier-Stokes equations through a free surface boundary condition.

For a fluid of constant density $\rho$ and dynamic viscosity $\mu$, at the free surface interface there is a balance between the normal stress and the curvature force associated with the surface tension:

$$\widehat{\bf n} \cdot \mathbb{T} \cdot \widehat{\bf n} = \sigma \left( \nabla \cdot \widehat{\bf n} \right)$$

Where $\widehat{\bf n}$ is the unit normal vector to the surface, $\mathbb{T}$ is the Cauchy stress tensor, and $\nabla\cdot$ is the divergence operator. The Cauchy stress tensor for an incompressible fluid takes the form:

$$\mathbb{T} = -pI + \mu\left[ \nabla {\bf v} + (\nabla {\bf v})^{T}  \right]$$

Introducing the dynamic pressure $p_{d} = p - \rho {\bf g} \cdot {\bf x}$ and, assuming high Reynolds number flow, it is possible to nondimensionalize the variables with the scalings:

$$p_{d} = \rho V^{2}p_{d}', \quad \nabla = L^{-1}\nabla', \quad {\bf g} = g{\bf g}', \quad {\bf x} = L{\bf x}', \quad {\bf v} = V{\bf v}'$$

The free surface boundary condition in nondimensionalized variables is then:

$$-p_{d}' + {1\over{\text{Fr}^{2}}}z' + {1 \over{\text{Re}}} \widehat{\bf n} \cdot \left[ \nabla'{\bf v}' + (\nabla'{\bf v}')^{T} \right] \cdot \widehat{\bf n} = {1\over{\text{We}}} \left( \nabla' \cdot \widehat{\bf n} \right)$$

Where $\text{Fr}$ is the Froude number, $\text{Re}$ is the Reynolds number, and $\text{We}$ is the Weber number. The influence of the Weber number can then be quantified relative to gravitational and viscous forces.

== Applications ==
One application of the Weber number is the study of heat pipes. When the momentum flux in the vapor core of the heat pipe is high, there is a possibility that the shear stress exerted on the liquid in the wick can be large enough to entrain droplets into the vapor flow. The Weber number is the dimensionless parameter that determines the onset of this phenomenon called the entrainment limit (Weber number greater than or equal to 1). In this case the Weber number is defined as the ratio of the momentum in the vapor layer divided by the surface tension force restraining the liquid, where the characteristic length is the surface pore size.
