= Vortex Bladeless =

Spanish wind power generator startup company

Vortex Bladeless Ltd.
- Type: Technology startup, limited company
- Industry: Renewable energy, Wind Energy
- Founded: 2014; 12 years ago
- Headquarters: Madrid & Avila, Spain
- Key people: cofounders: David Yáñez, David Suriol, Raul Martín
- Products: VIV oscillating wind power generators
- Website: vortexbladeless.com

Vortex Bladeless Ltd. is a Spanish technology startup company that is developing a specific type of wind power generator without rotating blades. Electricity is produced by a linear alternator from resonant vibrations caused by wind flowing past a mast which is pushed into oscillations through a process called vortex-induced vibration.

== Technology ==
Vortex Bladeless is a vortex-induced vibration resonant wind generator, in contrast to horizontal-axis wind turbines (HAWT) and vertical-axis wind turbines (VAWT) that work by rotation. It uses a fiberglass and carbon fiber reinforced polymer mast which oscillates in the wind, taking advantage of the emission of von Kármán vortices when a moving fluid passes over a slender structure. At the bottom of the mast, a carbon fiber rod moves a linear alternator that generates electricity with no moving parts in contact.

Vortex is a vertical, slender, cylindrical device. It is composed of two main parts: a fixed base where the device is attached to an anchor, and a flexible mast which, acting as a cantilever, interacts more freely with moving fluid in an oscillating movement. It has no gears or moving parts in contact, so it needs no oils or lubricants as do rotary machines. The device's operation barely requires maintenance and operating costs. All these features make them closer to solar power's features and make them more useful for distributed energy. A linear alternator transforms mechanical energy into electricity. It counts with neodymium magnets and its stator is located inside of the moving part of the device.

While converting mechanical energy into electricity, the alternator damps the induced oscillation movement and simultaneously can modify the natural oscillation frequency of the moving structure. Thus, the lock-in range is increased while maintaining the resonance frequency at higher wind speeds. The firm patented a mechanism called tuning system for this task, based on magnetic repulsion. Unlike rotary wind turbines, this phenomenon can modify the apparent elasticity constant of the structure which depends on the oscillation amplitude, allowing it to grow as long as wind speed grows. Despite its simplicity, 6 families of registered patents protect the design and technology worldwide.

== Story and biography ==
Vortex Bladeless Ltd. is a wind energy Spanish startup company that was formalised in 2012 by David Yáñez, David Suriol, and Raúl Martín. In 2014, they officially founded the firm as full-time employees. The original idea emerged in 2002 when David Suriol, the inventor, saw a video of the Tacoma Narrows Bridge (1940) disaster which led him to the idea that there is a lot of energy contained in the physical principle that collapsed the bridge, and it could be harnessed as a new way to generate energy from wind. His idea was kept in a drawer for years until 2012 when they began to look for investors and funding to start the project.

In early 2014, Vortex obtained public funding from the Centre for the Development of Industrial Technology (CDTI) and began to collaborate with Barcelona Supercomputing Center (BSC) and their huge computing resources for the simulations on vortex-induced vibrations (VIV), magnetic field interactions, and finite element method magnetics (FEMM) researches needed for their development. The proof of concept was validated and the story of Vortex began winning the South Summit Award 2014 in the category of Energy and Industry.

In 2015, the firm began collaborating with representatives from the Massachusetts Institute of Technology (MIT) and Harvard University. In the United States, the project reached the company Altair Engineering who offered their advanced simulation software to Vortex for their investigation on their fluid dynamics concept. Also, NGOs and other environmental entities like BirdLife International have shown interest in this system and offered to collaborate, since Vortex may have a lower impact on nature and birds, especially as bigger wind power devices are built in the future. Thanks to the support from these public administration and research centers, in 2015, Vortex launched in June a successful crowdfunding campaign to fund the first supply agreements, and hire engineers needed to advance the project.

In late 2016, and after validating the technology on computer simulations and technology demonstrators, the company reached the prototype stage with a geometry that can harness a useful amount of energy from the wind with this principle. At this stage, Vortex was able to apply for funding from the Horizon 2020 for research and innovation programme of the European Commission. Being the most funding that the company had, Vortex built a big wind tunnel, the tallest in Spain, for testing their systems, and began the development of their patented concept of an oscillating alternator with tuning system. On this phase, the company won the Seal of Excellence of the H2020 programme.

The goals of the firm for the future are to obtain the certification needed to start selling, and to set up a feasible method of production and logistics of shipping so they can start commercializing the first Vortex turbines for 2020. They have recently shown performance tests in Puerto Cortés, Honduras.

== Criticisms ==
Conventional modern wind turbines attain 2–3 megawatts nameplate capacity, 40–55% capacity factors, and can generate a kilowatt hour of electricity for $0.02–0.035. The inventors found an ideal wind speed of 26 miles per hour. Others have attempted bladeless technology. The Fuller Wind Turbine System was a bladeless wind turbine announced in 2010 by Solatec LLC. Saphon Energy announced a bladeless wind turbine in 2012.

Vortex Bladeless is attempting to produce a wind turbine that isn't actually a turbine. All generators require a magnetic field, a conductor and motion to produce electricity. A small generator can only produce a small amount of power. It takes a lot of energy (movement) to make a generator turn. The biggest are generally turned by massive amounts of falling water, heat, steam or air. There is very little movement in the Vortex "turbine". All the movement at the top doesn't translate to much down where the generator is. They use a linear generator.
