= Kármán vortex street =

Repeating pattern of swirling vortices

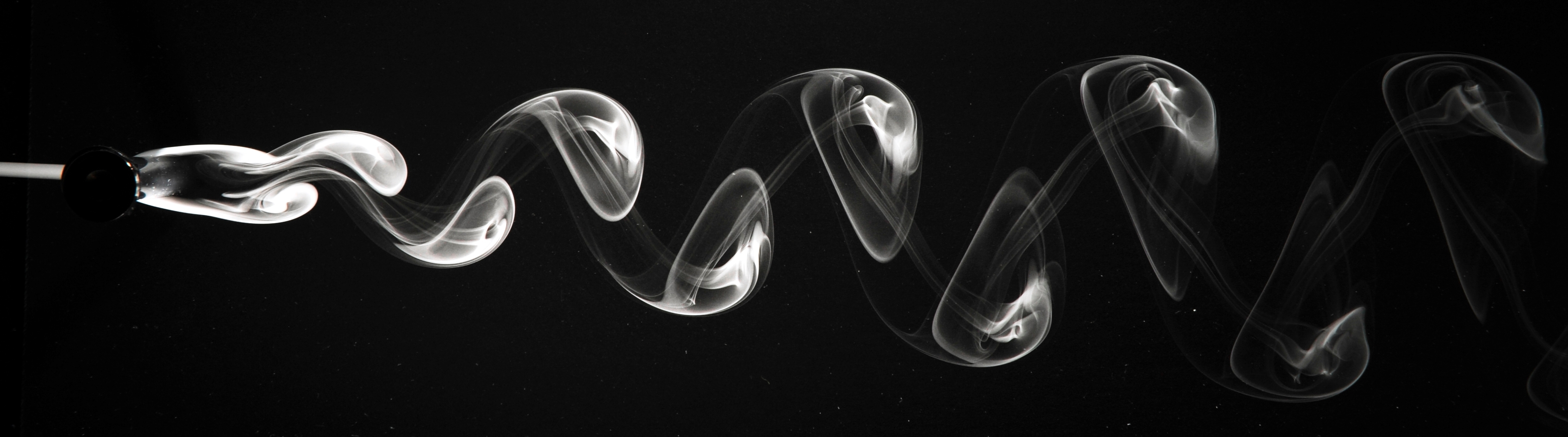
Visualisation of the vortex street behind a circular cylinder in air (on the left); the flow is made visible through release of glycerol vapour in the air near the cylinder

In fluid dynamics, a Kármán vortex street (or a von Kármán vortex street) is a repeating pattern of swirling vortices, caused by a process known as vortex shedding, which is responsible for the unsteady separation of flow of a fluid around blunt bodies.

It is named after the engineer and fluid dynamicist Theodore von Kármán, and is responsible for such phenomena as the "singing" of suspended telephone or power lines and the vibration of a car antenna at certain speeds.

Mathematical modeling of von Kármán vortex street can be performed using different techniques including but not limited to solving the full Navier-Stokes equations with k-epsilon, SST, k-omega and Reynolds stress, and large eddy simulation (LES) turbulence models, by numerically solving some dynamic equations such as the Ginzburg–Landau equation, or by use of a bicomplex variable.

== Analysis ==
Animation of vortex street created by a cylindrical object; the flow on opposite sides of the object is given different colors, showing that the vortices are shed from alternating sides of the object

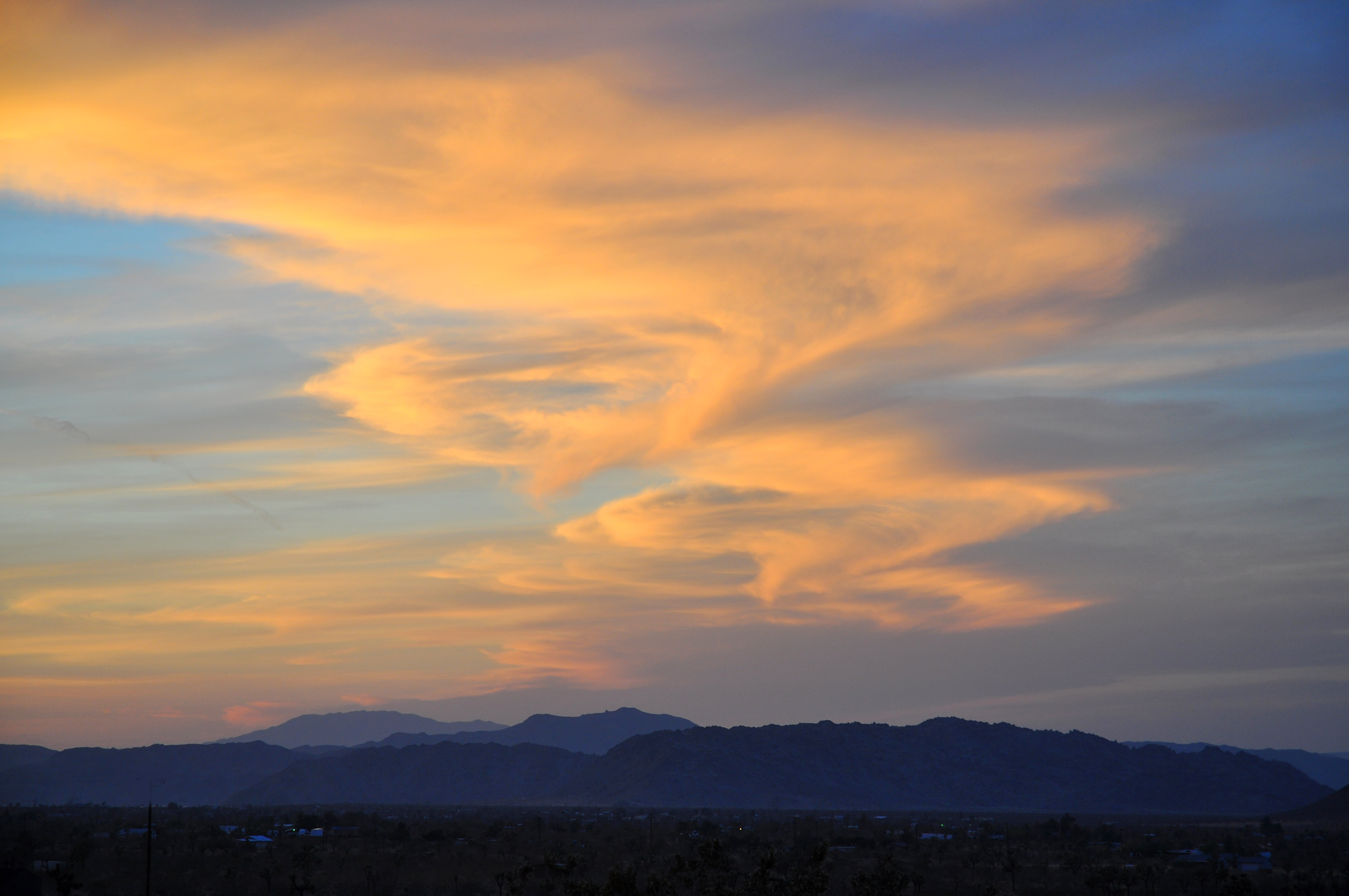
A look at the Kármán vortex street effect from ground level, as air flows quickly from the Pacific Ocean eastward over Mojave Desert mountains. This phenomenon observed from ground level is extremely rare; most cloud-related Kármán vortex street activity is viewed from space.

A vortex street in a 2D liquid of hard disks

A vortex street forms only at a certain range of flow velocities, specified by a range of Reynolds numbers (Re), typically above a limiting Re value of about 90. The (global) Reynolds number for a flow is a measure of the ratio of inertial to viscous forces in the flow of a fluid around a body or in a channel, and may be defined as a nondimensional parameter of the global speed of the whole fluid flow:
$$\begin{align}
\mathrm{Re}_L&=\frac{UL}{\nu_0}\\
\nu_0 &=\frac{\mu_0}{\rho_0}\\
\mathrm{Re}_L&=\frac{UL\rho_0}{\mu_0}\\
\end{align}$$
where:

- U = the free stream flow speed (i.e. the flow speed far from the fluid boundaries, U_{∞}, like the body speed relative to the fluid at rest, or an inviscid flow speed, computed through the Bernoulli equation), which is the original global flow parameter, i.e. the target to be non-dimensionalised.
- L = a characteristic length parameter of the body or channel
- ν_{0} = the free stream kinematic viscosity parameter of the fluid, which in turn is the ratio between:
  - ρ_{0} = the reference fluid density.
  - μ_{0} = the free stream fluid dynamic viscosity

For common flows (which can usually be considered as incompressible or isothermal), the kinematic viscosity is everywhere uniform over all the flow field and constant in time, so there is no choice on the viscosity parameter, which becomes naturally the kinematic viscosity of the fluid being considered at the temperature being considered. On the other hand, the reference length is always an arbitrary parameter, so particular attention should be put when comparing flows around different obstacles or in channels of different shapes: the global Reynolds numbers should be referred to the same reference length. This is actually the reason for which the most precise sources for airfoil and channel flow data specify the reference length at the Reynolds number. The reference length can vary depending on the analysis to be performed: for a body with circle sections such as circular cylinders or spheres, one usually chooses the diameter; for an airfoil, a generic non-circular cylinder or a bluff body or a revolution body like a fuselage or a submarine, it is usually the profile chord or the profile thickness, or some other given widths that are in fact stable design inputs; for flow channels usually the hydraulic diameter about which the fluid is flowing.

For an aerodynamic profile, the reference length depends on the analysis. In fact, the profile chord is usually chosen as the reference length also for aerodynamic coefficient for wing sections and thin profiles in which the primary target is to maximize the lift coefficient or the lift/drag ratio (i.e. as usual in thin airfoil theory, one would employ the chord Reynolds as the flow speed parameter for comparing different profiles). On the other hand, for fairings and struts the given parameter is usually the dimension of internal structure to be streamlined (let us think for simplicity it is a beam with circular section), and the main target is to minimize the drag coefficient or the drag/lift ratio. The main design parameter which becomes naturally also a reference length is therefore the profile thickness (the profile dimension or area perpendicular to the flow direction), rather than the profile chord.

The range of Re values varies with the size and shape of the body from which the eddies are shed, as well as with the kinematic viscosity of the fluid. For the wake of a circular cylinder, for which the reference length is conventionally the diameter d of the circular cylinder, the lower limit of this range is Re ≈ 47. Eddies are shed continuously from each side of the circle boundary, forming rows of vortices in its wake. The alternation leads to the core of a vortex in one row being opposite the point midway between two vortex cores in the other row, giving rise to the distinctive pattern shown in the picture. Ultimately, the energy of the vortices is consumed by viscosity as they move further down stream, and the regular pattern disappears. Above the Re value of 188.5, the flow becomes three-dimensional, with periodic variation along the cylinder. Above Re on the order of 10^{5} at the drag crisis, vortex shedding becomes irregular and turbulence sets in.

When a single vortex is shed, an asymmetrical flow pattern forms around the body and changes the pressure distribution. This means that the alternate shedding of vortices can create periodic lateral (sideways) forces on the body in question, causing it to vibrate. If the vortex shedding frequency is similar to the natural frequency of a body or structure, it causes resonance. It is this forced vibration that, at the correct frequency, causes suspended telephone or power lines to "sing" and the antenna on a car to vibrate more strongly at certain speeds.

== In meteorology ==
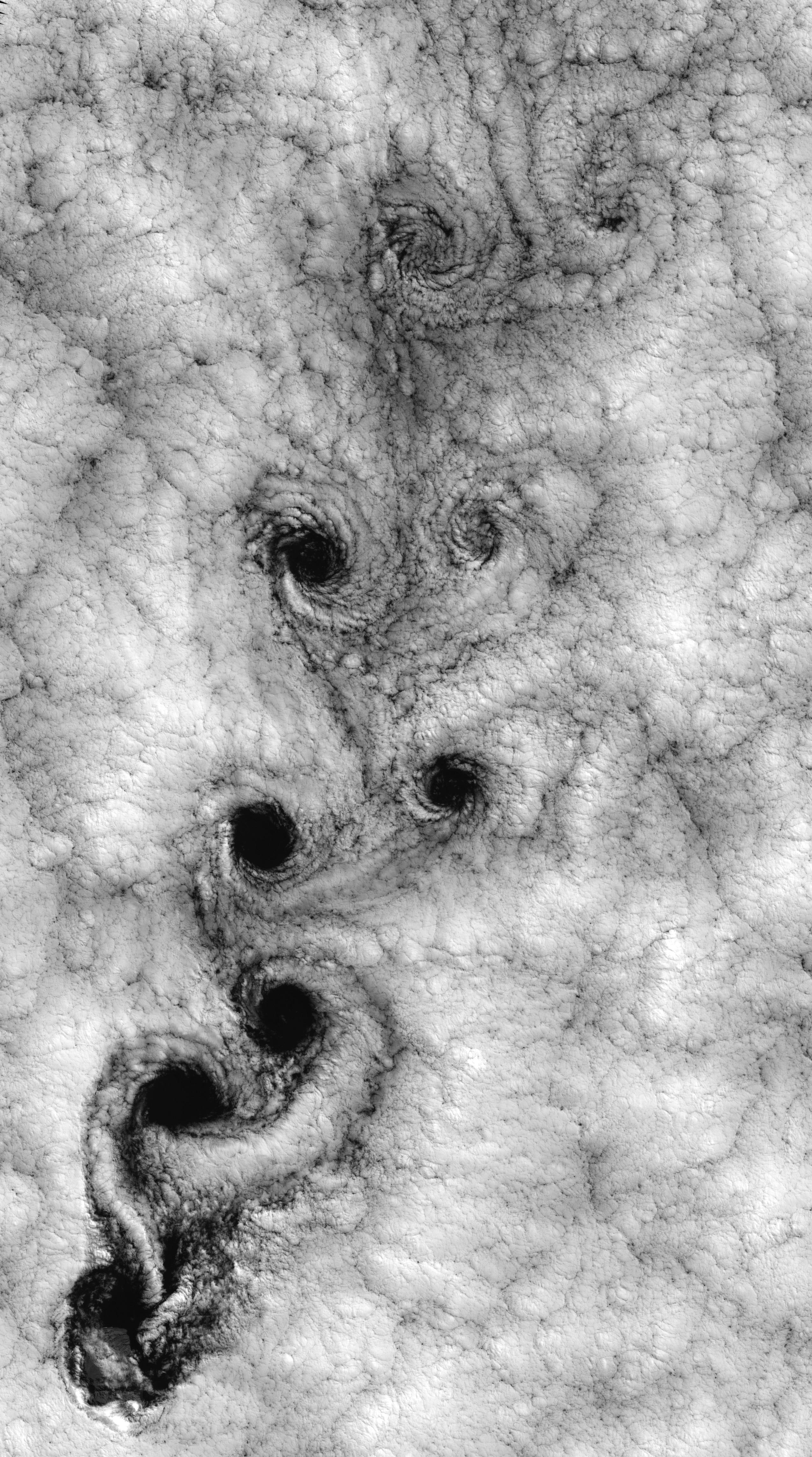
Kármán vortex street caused by wind flowing around the Juan Fernández Islands off the Chilean coast (left), and a satellite loop of Von Kármán vortices near Socorro Island (right).

The flow of atmospheric air over obstacles such as islands or isolated mountains sometimes results in von Kármán vortex streets. When a cloud layer is present at the relevant altitude, the streets become visible. Such cloud layer vortex streets have been photographed from satellites, and can reach over 400 km (250 mi) from the obstacle, with vortex diameters normally between 20–40 km (12–25 mi).

== Engineering problems ==
Simulated vortex street around a no-slip cylindrical obstruction

The same cylinder, now with a fin, suppressing the vortex street by reducing the region in which the side eddies can interact

In low turbulence, tall buildings can produce a Kármán street, so long as the structure is uniform along its height. In urban areas where there are many other tall structures nearby, the turbulence produced by these can prevent the formation of coherent vortices. Periodic crosswind forces set up by vortices along object's sides can be highly undesirable, due to the vortex-induced vibrations caused, which can damage the structure, hence it is important for engineers to account for the possible effects of vortex shedding when designing a wide range of structures, from submarine periscopes to industrial chimneys and skyscrapers. For monitoring such engineering structures, the efficient measurements of von Kármán streets can be performed using smart sensing algorithms such as compressive sensing.

Even more serious instability can be created in concrete cooling towers, especially when built together in clusters. Vortex shedding caused the collapse of three towers at Ferrybridge Power Station C in 1965 during high winds.

The failure of the original Tacoma Narrows Bridge was originally attributed to excessive vibration due to vortex shedding, but was actually caused by aeroelastic flutter.

Kármán turbulence is also a problem for airplanes, especially when landing.

=== Solutions ===
==== Tuned mass damper (TMD) ====
To prevent vortex shedding and mitigate unwanted vibrations of cylindrical bodies (such as a tall chimney or mast), a tuned mass damper (TMD) is often used. A tuned mass damper is a device consisting of a mass-spring system specifically designed and tuned to counteract vibrations induced by vortex shedding. It is often attached to the structure through springs or dampers.

The effectiveness of a tuned mass damper in mitigating vortex shedding-induced vibrations depends on factors such as the mass of the damper, its placement on the structure, and the tuning of the system. Engineers carefully analyze structural dynamics and characteristics of the vortex shedding phenomenon to determine the optimal parameters for the tuned mass damper. In many cases, the spring is represented by suspending the mass on cables such that it forms a pendulum system with the same resonance frequency. The mass is carefully tuned to have a natural frequency that matches the dominant frequency of the vortex shedding.

As the structure is subjected to vortex shedding-induced vibrations, the tuned mass damper oscillates in an out-of-phase motion with the structure. This counteracts the vibrations, reducing their amplitudes and minimizing the potential for resonance and structural damage.

==== Fins & strakes ====
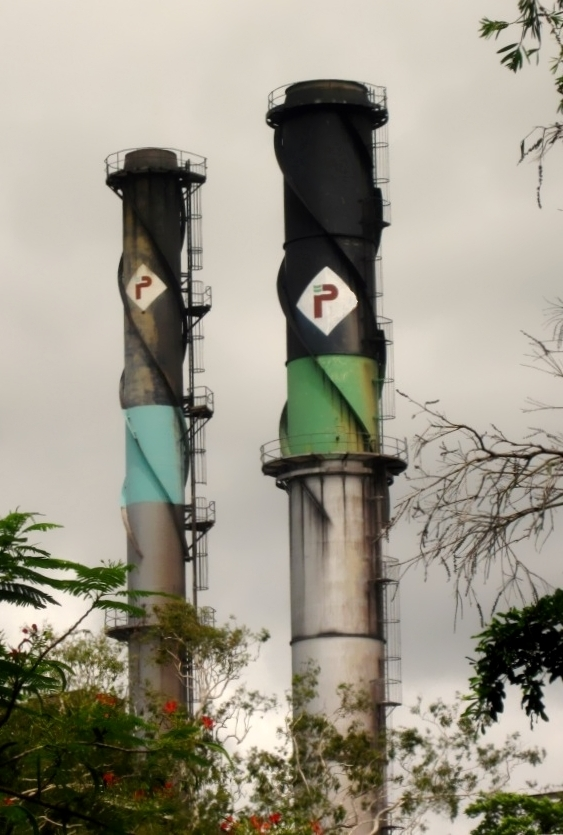
Chimneys with strakes fitted to break up vortices

Another solution to prevent unwanted vibration of such cylindrical bodies is a longitudinal fin that can be fitted on the downstream side, which, provided it is longer than the diameter of the cylinder, prevents the eddies from interacting, and consequently they remain attached.

Obviously, for a tall building or mast, the relative wind could come from any direction. For this reason, helical projections (strakes) resembling large screw threads are sometimes placed at the top, which effectively create asymmetric three-dimensional flow, thereby discouraging the alternate shedding of vortices; this is also found in some car antennas.

==== Other countermeasures ====
Another countermeasure with tall buildings is using variation in the diameter with height, such as tapering - that prevents the entire building from being driven at the same frequency.

== Formula ==
This formula generally holds true for the range 250 < Re_{d} < 200000:
$$\text{St} = 0.198\left (1-\frac{19.7}{\text{Re}_d}\right )\$$
where:
$$\text{St}=\frac {f d}{U}$$

- f = vortex shedding frequency.
- d = diameter of the cylinder
- U = flow velocity.

This dimensionless parameter St is known as the Strouhal number and is named after the Czech physicist, Vincenc Strouhal (1850–1922) who first investigated the steady humming or singing of telegraph wires in 1878.

== History ==
Although named after Theodore von Kármán, he acknowledged that the vortex street had been studied earlier by Arnulph Mallock and Henri Bénard. Kármán tells the story in his book Aerodynamics:

[...] Prandtl had a doctoral candidate, Karl Hiemenz, to whom he gave the task of constructing a water channel in which he could observe the separation of the flow behind a cylinder. The object was to check experimentally the separation point calculated by means of the boundary-layer theory. For this purpose, it was first necessary to know the pressure distribution around the cylinder in a steady flow. Much to his surprise, Hiemenz found that the flow in his channel oscillated violently. When he reported this to Prandtl, the latter told him: 'Obviously your cylinder is not circular.' However, even after very careful machining of the cylinder, the flow continued to oscillate. Then Hiemenz was told that possibly the channel was not symmetric, and he started to adjust it. I was not concerned with this problem, but every morning when I came in the laboratory I asked him, 'Herr Hiemenz, is the flow steady now?' He answered very sadly, 'It always oscillates.'

In his autobiography, von Kármán described how his discovery was inspired by an Italian painting of St Christopher carrying the child Jesus whilst wading through water. Vortices could be seen in the water, and von Kármán noted that "The problem for historians may have been why Christopher was carrying Jesus through the water. For me it was why the vortices". It has been suggested by researchers that the painting is one from the 14th century that can be found in the museum of the San Domenico church in Bologna.

== See also ==
- Coandă effect – Tendency of a fluid jet to stay attached to a surface of any form
- Eddy (fluid dynamics) – Swirling and reverse current in a turbulent flow regime
- Hallasan – Volcano on Jeju Island, South Korea
- Kelvin–Helmholtz instability – Phenomenon of fluid mechanics
- Reynolds number – Ratio of inertial to viscous forces acting on a liquid
- Vortex-induced vibration – Motions induced on bodies within a fluid flow due to vortices in the fluid
- Vortex shedding – Oscillating flow effect resulting from fluid passing over a blunt body
