= Strouhal =

Strouhal (feminine: Strouhalová) is a Czech surname. It may refer to:

- Vincenc Strouhal (1850–1922), Czech physicist
- Grzegorz Strouhal (1942–2016), Polish sport shooter

== See also ==
- Strouhal number
- 7391 Strouhal
