= Conductor gallop =

High-amplitude, low-frequency oscillation of overhead power lines due to wind

Galloping conductors in eastern Idaho around Christmastime 1998.

Conductor gallop is the high-amplitude, low-frequency oscillation of overhead power lines due to wind. The movement of the wires occurs most commonly in the vertical plane, although horizontal or rotational motion is also possible. The natural frequency mode tends to be around 1 Hz, leading the often graceful periodic motion to also be known as conductor dancing. The oscillations can exhibit amplitudes in excess of a metre, and the displacement is sometimes sufficient for the phase conductors to infringe operating clearances (coming too close to other objects), and causing flashover. The forceful motion also adds significantly to the loading stress on insulators and electricity pylons, raising the risk of mechanical failure of either.

The mechanisms that initiate gallop are not always clear, though it is thought to be often caused by asymmetric conductor aerodynamics due to ice build up on one side of a wire. The crescent of encrusted ice approximates an aerofoil, altering the normally round profile of the wire and increasing the tendency to oscillate.

Gallop can be a significant problem for transmission system operators, particularly where lines cross open, windswept country and are at risk to ice loading. If gallop is likely to be a concern, designers can employ smooth-faced conductors, whose improved icing and aerodynamic characteristics reduce the motion. Additionally, anti-gallop devices may be mounted to the line to convert the lateral motion to a less damaging twisting one. Increasing the tension in the line and adopting more rigid insulator attachments have the effect of reducing galloping motion. These measures can be costly, are often impractical after the line has been constructed, and can increase the tendency for the line to exhibit high frequency oscillations.

If ice loading is suspected, it may be possible to increase power transfer on the line, and so raise its temperature by Joule heating, melting the ice. The sudden loss of ice from a line can result in a phenomenon called "jump", in which the catenary dramatically rebounds upwards in response to the change in weight. If the risk of trip is high, the operator may elect to pre-emptively switch out the line in a controlled manner rather than face an unexpected fault. The risk of mechanical failure of the line remains.

== Theoretical analysis ==
The earliest studies of long wires embedded in a moving fluid motion dates to the late 19th century, when Vincenc Strouhal explained "singing" wires in terms of vortex shedding. Gallop is now known to arise from a different physical phenomenon: aerodynamic lift. Ice accumulated on the wire destroys the circular symmetry of the wire, and the natural up-and-down "singing" motion of a wire changes the angle of attack of the iced wire in the wind. For certain shapes, the variation in lift across the different angles is so large that it excites large-scale oscillations.

Mathematically, an unloaded extended wire in dead air can be approximated as a mass m suspended at height y by a spring with constant k. If the wind moves with velocity U, then it makes angle α with the wire, where

$$\tan{\alpha}=\frac{\dot{y}}{U}\text{.}$$

At large wind velocities, the lift and drag induced on the wire are proportional to the square of the wind velocity, but the proportionality constants C_{L} and C_{D} (for a noncircular wire) depend on α:

$$F_j=\frac{1}{2}\rho (U^2+\dot{y}^2)l\cdot C_j\quad\quad\quad\text{(}j\in\{\text{L},\text{D}\}\text{),}$$

where ρ is the fluid density and l the length of the wire.

In principle, the excited oscillation can take three forms: rotation of the wire, horizontal sway, or vertical plunge. Most gallops combine rotation with at least one of the other two forms. For algebraic simplicity, this article will analyze a conductor only experiencing plunge (and not rotation); a similar treatment can address other dynamics. From geometrical considerations, the vertical component of the force must be

$$\frac{1}{2}\rho l(U^2+\dot{y}^2)(C_L\cos{\alpha}+C_D\sin{\alpha})\approx\frac{1}{2}\rho lU^2\left(C_L|_{\alpha=0}-\frac{\dot{y}}{U}\left.\left(C_D+\frac{\partial C_L}{\partial\alpha}\right)\right|_{\alpha=0}\right)\text{,}$$

keeping only terms first-order in the regime ẏ ≪ U. Gallop occurs whenever the driving coefficient 1/2ρlU · (C_{D} + ∂C_{L}/∂α)|_{α = 0} exceeds the natural damping of the wire; in particular, a necessary-but-not-sufficient condition is that
$$\left.\left(C_D+\frac{\partial C_L}{\partial\alpha}\right)\right|_{\alpha=0}<0\text{.}$$
This is known as the Den Hartog gallop condition, after the engineer who first discovered it.

At low wind velocities U, the above analysis begins to fail, because the gallop oscillation couples to the vortex shedding.

== Flutter ==
A similar aeolian phenomenon is flutter, caused by vortices on the leeward side of the wire, and which is distinguished from gallop by its high-frequency (10 Hz), low-amplitude motion. To control flutter, transmission lines may be fitted with tuned mass dampers (known as Stockbridge dampers) clamped to the wires close to the towers. The use of bundle conductor spacers can also be of benefit.

== See also ==
- Aeolian vibration
