= Helical strake =

Element used on cylindrical structures

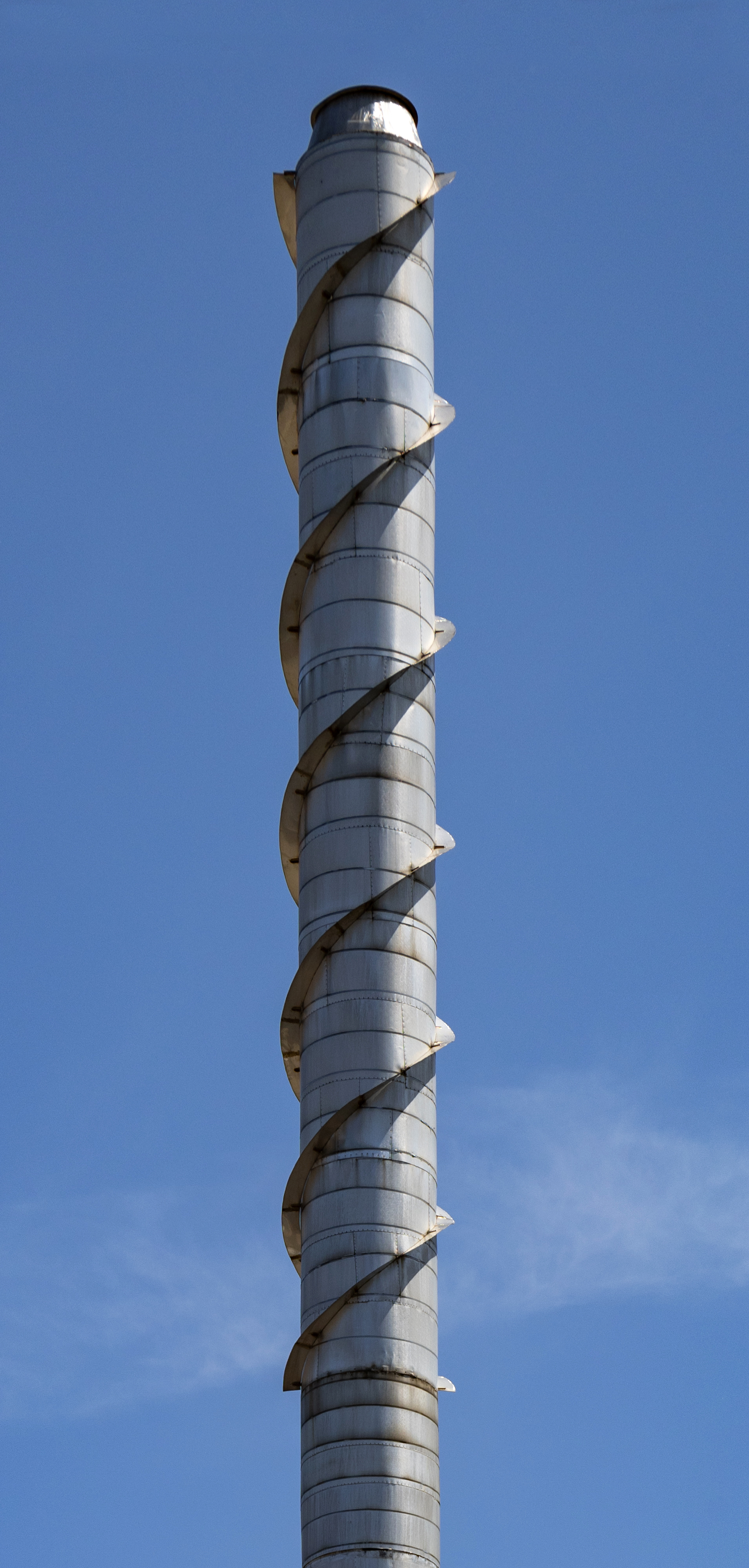
A two-start helical strake on a chimney

A helical strake, also known as a Scruton strake, is a helix-shaped fin arranged along a structure to disrupt fluid flow. It serves to mitigate fatigue by disrupting the vortexes forming a Kármán vortex street, thus reducing the resulting vibrations. Introduced by Christopher Scruton and D. E. J. Walshe in 1957, helical strakes have been widely adopted as an engineering solution for controlling the oscillations caused by airflow and water flow.

== Description ==
Helical strakes are fins that follow a helix down a structure; they are commonly used on cylindrical bodies such as chimneys and pipelines. Starting with screw heads, strakes continue along the structure and disrupt the vortexes that form as a result of fluid flow by ensuring that flow is shed at different heights and no structured vortexes can be formed. In this manner, strakes reduce vibrations and mitigate fatigue; multiple strakes are often used, as this minimizes the possibility of alternate vortexes forming. They may be used on their own, or in conjunction with other devices such as fairings.

Strakes need not follow the entirety of the structure. Vibration suppression is most effective in regions where structural deflection is highest, as these are the areas where modal displacement is greatest, as these regions contribute most strongly to the overall dynamic response. Consequently, many structures are only covered in helical strakes where the vibrations are greatest; many are limited to the upper third of the structure.

Sections of helical strakes are generally assembled from shorter lengths. Strakes thus commonly consist of a series of segments, with the number determined by the length of the structure covered. Metal strakes are cut from larger plates to a radius of curvature informed by the number of revolutions around the stack. Conventionally, strakes have a pitch of 16 to 17.5D, though other pitches may be used.

Helical strakes are less sensitive to flow direction than alternatives such as fairings. However, they have several shortcomings. They significantly increase mean drag, and as a result loading is increased. Strakes are ineffective when the structure has insufficient mass per unit length or insufficient structural damping, resulting in vibration amplitudes that cannot be reduced to acceptable levels. Installing strakes on an existing structure is less effective when the incoming flow is already turbulent, as turbulent flow reduces vortex shedding coherence and introduces broadband excitation, limiting the additional suppression achievable by strakes. Strakes likewise are less effective when located downstream from each other; the wake behind the first strake is unstable, and thus the efficacy of downstream strakes varies significantly. Staggered helical strakes are likewise less effective. The presence of structures perpendicular to the cylinder will also reduce strakes' effectiveness.

Helical strakes are often considered an economical solution for mitigating flow-induced vibrations. However, they cannot be regarded as universally effective. Their performance depends strongly on structural and aerodynamic parameters and is only considered reliable where sufficient structural mass and damping are present, and coherent vortex shedding remains the dominant excitation mechanism. In cases where these conditions are not met, vibration amplitudes may remain excessive despite the presence of strakes. Under such circumstances, alternative mitigation measures that increase the effective modal damping, such as tuned mass dampers, may be required to achieve acceptable vibration levels.

== History ==
Slender structures are prone to fatigue damage from vortex-induced vibration, a result of external fluid flow creating a Kármán vortex street – a series of alternating vortexes – behind them. Consequently, extensive research has been undertaken to understand and suppress these vibrations, thereby mitigating damage to structures exposed to airflow and water flow. Numerous geometric forms have been proposed as a passive means of vibration mitigation, including tripping wires and splitting plates. Other approaches, such as electrical methods, rotary oscillations, and feedback control, have been used as active methods.

Helical strakes are designed to disrupt the Kármán vortex street caused by vortex shedding.

In 1957, Christopher Scruton and D. E. J. Walshe of the National Physics Laboratory in the United Kingdom explored the use of helical strakes with rectangular cross-sections as a means of suppressing vortex-induced vibration by disrupting the vortex shedding process. After the success of this experiment, which led to helical strakes sometimes being known as Scruton strakes, subsequent researchers sought to improve strake performance and explore the design's effectiveness in water. Strakes began to be widely adopted in the 1960s as an element of wind engineering; ocean-borne versions were introduced in the 1970s. Strakes became "one of the most successful and widely used means of suppressing eddy shedding."

Research into strakes has investigated the effect of various elements on design efficacy, including not only the pitch, height, density, and shape of fins but also the number of start screw heads. Generally, higher strakes and triple-start designs have been found to be more effective in both air and water environments. Several studies have investigated the potential for new geometries intended to reduce strakes' effect on drag. Proposed new designs have included serrated strakes, as well as inverted helical strakes wherein flow is disrupted not by fins but by internally protruding grooves.

== Works cited ==
- Allen, Don W.; Liapis, Stergios (1 September 2014). "Helical Strake Testing Suggests Path to VIV Solution". Offshore. 74 (9): 84–86.
- Assi, Gustavo R. S.; Crespi, Tomasso (2020). "Comparison of Serrated Helical Strakes in Suppressing the Vortex-Induced Vibrations of a Circular Cylinder". In Saenz, Adan Vega; Couce, Luis Carral; Arenas, Jymmy Saravia (eds.). Proceeding of the VI International Ship Design & Naval Engineering Congress (CIDIN) and XXVI Pan-American Congress of Naval Engineering, Maritime Transportation and Port Engineering (COPINAVAL). Springer. pp. 287–298. ISBN 978-3-030-35963-8.
- Bai, Yong; Bai, Qiang (2005). Subsea Pipelines and Risers. Elsevier. ISBN 978-0-08-044566-3.
- Escoe, Keith (2011). Pressure Vessel and Stacks Field Repair Manual. Elsevier. ISBN 978-0-08-055918-6.
- Feldmeier, Achim (2020). Theoretical Fluid Dynamics. Springer. ISBN 978-3-030-31022-6.
- Kilner, Andrew A.; Kurts, Phil; Potts, Douglas; Johnstone, Daniel; Potts, Andrew E.; Marcollo, Hayden (February 2018). The Efficacy of Inverted Helical Strakes. 23rd Offshore Symposium. Houston, Texas.
- Model Code For Steel Chimneys – The Cicind Chimney Standard (2 ed.). Ratingen, Germany: Cicind. 2010. ISBN 978-1-902998-16-9.
- Naudascher, Eduard; Rockwell, Donald (2012). Flow-Induced Vibrations: An Engineering Guide. Courier Corporation. ISBN 978-0-486-13613-4.
- Rashidi, Saman; Hayatdavoodi, Masoud; Esfahani, Javad Abolfazli (2016). "Vortex Shedding Suppression and Wake Control: A Review". Ocean Engineering. 126: 57–80. Bibcode:2016OcEng.126...57R. doi:10.1016/j.oceaneng.2016.08.031.
- Xu, Wanhai (2022). "Vortex Shedding and VIV Suppression". In Cui, Weicheng; Fu, Shixiao; Hu, Zhiqiang (eds.). Encyclopedia of Ocean Engineering. Springer. pp. 2103–2111. ISBN 978-981-10-6946-8.
- Xu, Wan-hai; Luan, Ying-sen; Liu, Li-qin; Wu, Ying-xiang (2017). "Influences of the Helical Strake Cross-Section Shape on Vortex-Induced Vibrations Suppression for A Long Flexible Cylinder" (PDF). China Ocean Engineering. 31 (4): 438–446. Bibcode:2017ChOE...31..438X. doi:10.1007/s13344-017-0050-1. Archived from the original (PDF) on 29 August 2024.
- Xu, Wan-hai; Ma, Ye-Xuan (2024). "A Review on Vibration Control of Multiple Cylinders Subjected to Flow-Induced Vibrations". China Ocean Engineering. 38 (2): 183–197. Bibcode:2024ChOE...38..183X. doi:10.1007/s13344-024-0016-z.
- Zdravkovich, M.M. (1981). "Review and Classification of Various Aerodynamic and Hydrodynamic Means for Suppressing Vortex Shedding". Journal of Wind Engineering and Industrial Aerodynamics. 7 (2): 145–189. Bibcode:1981JWEIA...7..145Z. doi:10.1016/0167-6105(81)90036-2.
- Zdravkovich, M.M. (1997). Flow Around Circular Cylinders. Vol. 2. Oxford University Press. ISBN 978-0-19-856561-1.
