= Vortex-induced vibration =

Motions induced on bodies within a fluid flow due to vortices in the fluid

Numerical simulation of vortex-induced vibrations due to the flow around a circular cylinder.

In fluid dynamics, vortex-induced vibrations (VIV) are motions induced on bodies interacting with an external fluid flow, produced by, or the motion producing, periodic irregularities on this flow.

A classic example is the VIV of an underwater cylinder. How this happens can be seen by putting a cylinder into the water (a swimming-pool or even a bucket) and moving it through the water in a direction perpendicular to its axis. Since real fluids always present some viscosity, the flow around the cylinder will be slowed while in contact with its surface, forming a so-called boundary layer. At some point, however, that layer can separate from the body because of its excessive curvature. A vortex is then formed, changing the pressure distribution along the surface. When the vortex does not form symmetrically around the body (with respect to its midplane), different lift forces develop on each side of the body, thus leading to motion transverse to the flow. This motion changes the nature of the vortex formation in such a way as to lead to a limited motion amplitude (differently, than, from what would be expected in a typical case of resonance). This process then repeats until the flow rate changes substantially.

VIV manifests itself on many different branches of engineering, from cables to heat exchanger tube arrays. It is also a major consideration in the design of ocean structures. Thus, study of VIV is a part of many disciplines, incorporating fluid mechanics, structural mechanics, vibrations, computational fluid dynamics (CFD), acoustics, statistics, and smart materials.

== Motivation ==
They occur in many engineering situations, such as bridges, stacks, transmission lines, aircraft control surfaces, offshore structures, thermowells, engines, heat exchangers, marine cables, towed cables, drilling and production risers in petroleum production, mooring cables, moored structures, tethered structures, buoyancy and spar hulls, pipelines, cable-laying, members of jacketed structures, and other hydrodynamic and hydroacoustic applications. The most recent interest in long cylindrical members in water ensues from the development of hydrocarbon resources in depths of 1000 m or more. See also and.

Vortex-induced vibration (VIV) is an important source of fatigue damage of offshore oil exploration drilling, export, production risers, including steel catenary risers (SCRs) and tension leg platform (TLP) tendons or tethers. These slender structures experience both current flow and top-end vessel motions, which both give rise to the flow-structure relative motions and cause VIVs.

One of the classical open-flow problems in fluid mechanics concerns the flow around a circular cylinder, or more generally, a bluff body. At very low Reynolds numbers (based on the diameter of the circular member) the streamlines of the resulting flow is perfectly symmetric as expected from potential theory. However, as the Reynolds number is increased the flow becomes asymmetric and the so-called Kármán vortex street occurs. The motion of the cylinder thus generated due to the vortex shedding can be harnessed to generate electrical power.

The Strouhal number relates the frequency of shedding to the velocity of the flow and a characteristic dimension of the body (diameter in the case of a cylinder). It is defined as $\textrm{St}=f_{st}D/U$ and is named after Čeněk (Vincent) Strouhal (a Czech scientist). In the equation f_{st} is the vortex shedding frequency (or the Strouhal frequency) of a body at rest, D is the diameter of the circular cylinder, and U is the velocity of the ambient flow.

=== Lock-in range ===
The Strouhal number for a cylinder is 0.2 over a wide range of flow velocities. The phenomenon of lock-in happens when the vortex shedding frequency becomes close to a natural fundamental frequency of vibration of a structure. When this occurs, large and damaging vibrations can result.

== Current state of art ==
Much progress has been made during the past decade, both numerically and experimentally, toward the understanding of the kinematics (dynamics) of VIV, albeit in the low-Reynolds number regime. The fundamental reason for this is that VIV is not a small perturbation superimposed on a mean steady motion. It is an inherently nonlinear, self-governed or self-regulated, multi-degree-of-freedom phenomenon. It presents unsteady flow characteristics manifested by the existence of two unsteady shear layers and large-scale structures.

There is much that is known and understood and much that remains in the empirical/descriptive realm of knowledge: what is the dominant response frequency, the range of normalized velocity, the variation of the phase angle (by which the force leads the displacement), and the response amplitude in the synchronization range as a function of the controlling and influencing parameters? Industrial applications highlight our inability to predict the dynamic response of fluid–structure interactions. They continue to require the input of the in-phase and out-of-phase components of the lift coefficients (or the transverse force), in-line drag coefficients, correlation lengths, damping coefficients, relative roughness, shear, waves, and currents, among other governing and influencing parameters, and thus also require the input of relatively large safety factors. Fundamental studies as well as large-scale experiments (when these results are disseminated in the open literature) will provide the necessary understanding for the quantification of the relationships between the response of a structure and the governing and influencing parameters.

It cannot be emphasized strongly enough that the current laboratory state of art concerns the interaction of a rigid body (mostly and most importantly for a circular cylinder) whose degrees of freedom have been reduced from six to often one (i.e., transverse motion) with a three-dimensional separated flow, dominated by large-scale vortical structures.

== See also ==
- Aeroelastic flutter
- Kármán vortex street
- Vortex power
- Vortex shedding
