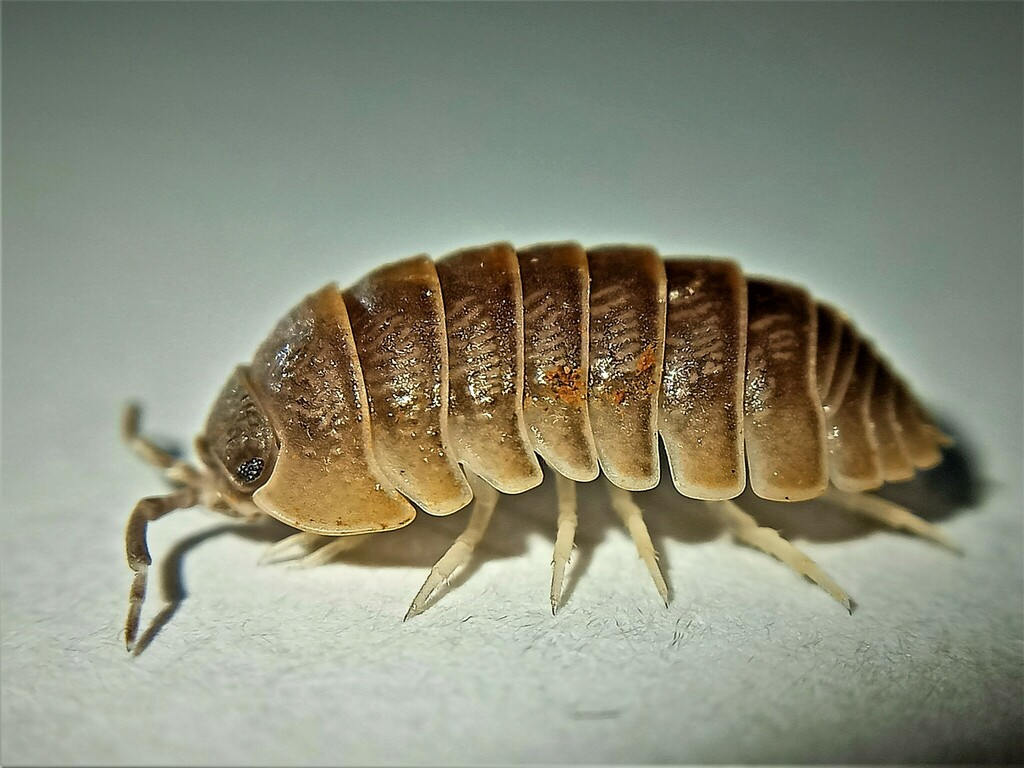
- A living specimen of Armadillidium atticum from Mount Aigaleo, near Athens.

Scientific classification
- Kingdom: Animalia
- Phylum: Arthropoda
- Class: Malacostraca
- Order: Isopoda
- Suborder: Oniscidea
- Family: Armadillidiidae
- Genus: Armadillidium
- Species: A. atticum

Binomial name
- Armadillidium atticum Strouhal, 1929
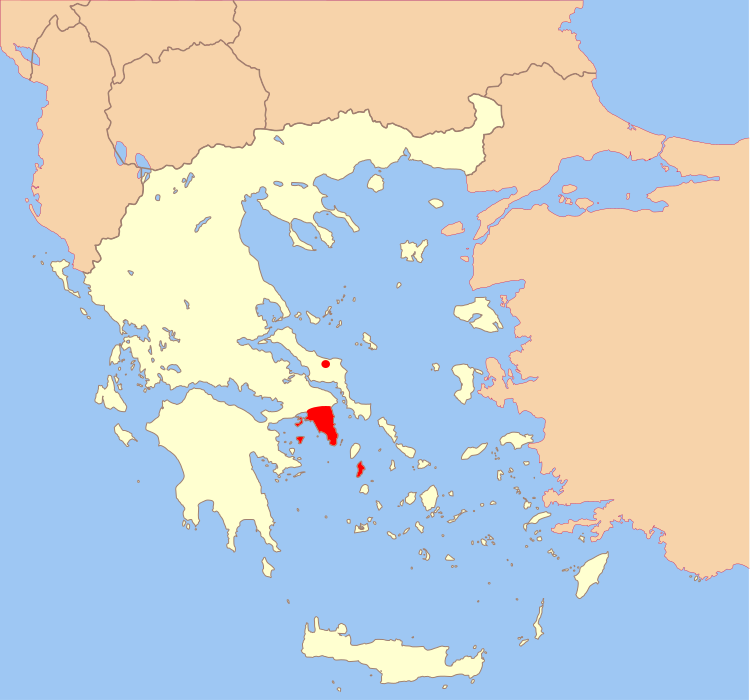
- Distribution of Armadillidium atticum (in red)

= Armadillidium atticum =

Species of crustacean

Armadillidium atticum is a European species of woodlouse endemic to Greece. It is a relatively small species and belongs to the so called "Armadillidium insulanum complex".

== Taxonomy ==
Armadilliidum atticum was originally described as a distinct species of Armadillidium based on specimens collected from the surroundings of Athens. It belongs to the "Armadillidiae" section of the genus, which is characterized by rib-like side edges of the forehead that never form a "frontal brim" along with the frontal shield, a frontal triangle with lateral edges that never reach the areas of the ocelli, relatively steeply-dropping epimera on all tergites and anterior lobes of the first pair of epimera that are usually either not curved upwards or with a slight hint of a bend. Additionally, the species is part of the "Armadillidium insulanum complex", a group of closely related, small sized pill bugs that occur in various Aegean Islands and the nearby Greek and Turkish coasts. Specifically, within this group, Armadillidium atticum is most closely related to Armadillidium insulanum sensu lato, from which it can safely been separated only by the more elongated first pleopod-exopodite of the male.

Historically, three subspecies of Armadillidium atticum have been described. However, their validity is disputed with various sources accepting none, some or all of them. The subspecies, and their diagnostic characters, are the following:

- Armadillidium atticum atticum (Strouhal, 1929): Being the nominate subspecies, it is characterized by the very long posterior lobe of the first pleopod-exopodite of the male and the wide and deep groove found in the middle of the head, immediately behind the frontal shield.
- Armadillidium atticum brevipes (Strouhal, 1937): This subspecies has the posterior lobe of the first pleopod-exopodite much shorter, being only about half as long as the anterior one.
- Armadillidium atticum cythnium (Strouhal, 1937): This subspecies holds an intermediate position between the other two, as it is characterized by a posterior lobe which is longer than that of A. atticum brevipes, but shorter than that of A. atticum atticum. It also has a much narrower and shallower head-groove than A. atticum atticum.

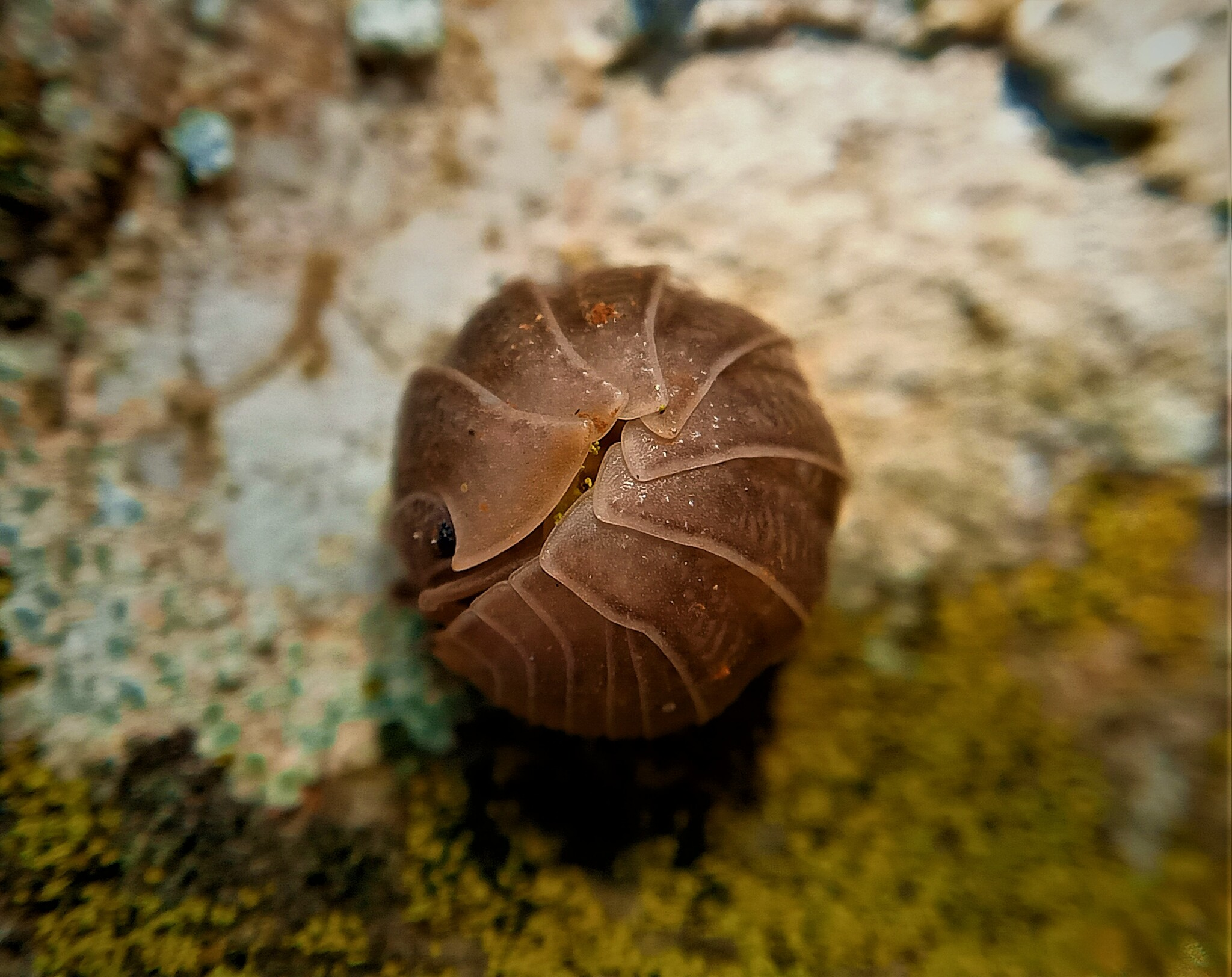
A specimen in defensive position.

== Description ==
Armadillidium atticum is a small to medium sized species, reaching maximum dimensions of only about 13.5 x 5.8 mm. Its tergites are covered with granulations and the coloration of the body consists of a pale greyish-brown hue with lighter epimera. The frontal shield surpasses the anterior edge of the head, has a straight to curved upper margin and its lateral corners are pronounced. The head itself has a groove in the middle, immediately behind the frontal shield. The lobes of the secondary antennae are trapezoidal and the distal article of the flagellum is slightly longer than the first. The hind margins of the first pair of epimera are rounded. The telson is triangular, as wide as long and has straight sides and a rounded tip.

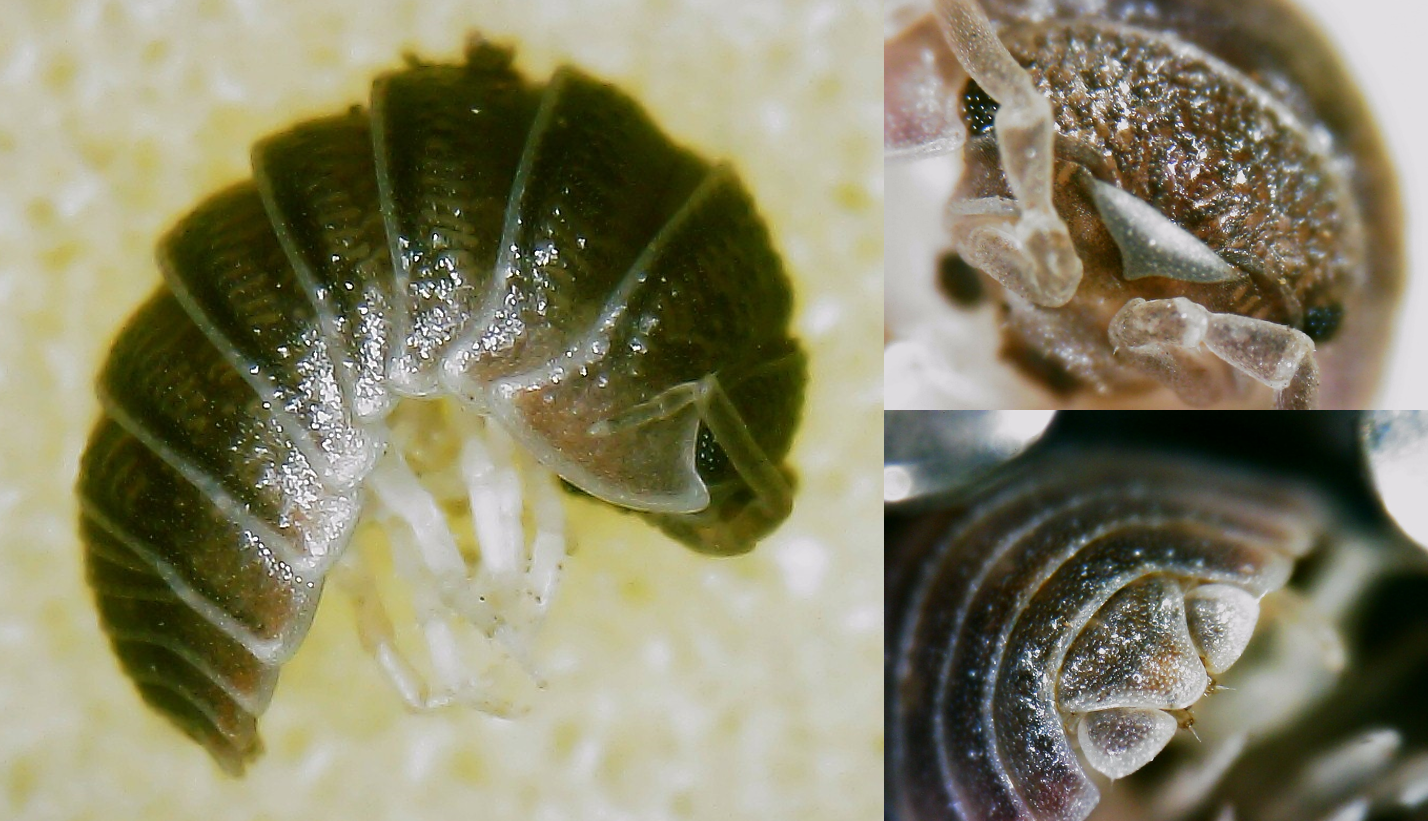
Various views of an Armadillidium atticum specimen: Lateral view of the whole body (left), close-up of the head (above right) and close-up of the telson (below right)

Concerning the sexual characters of the male, the first pereiopod has a weakly developed brush of short spines on the carpus and the seventh pereiopod a ventrally concave ischium, decorated with a longitudinal hair-field at the apical part. The first pleopod has an exopodite with a narrow, elongated posterior lobe and an endopodite with straight apex.

== Distribution ==
Armadillidium atticum is endemic to Central Greece and Cyclades. In particular, until now, the species has been found in the region of Attica on the mainland and the islands of Euboea, Salamis, Aegina and Kythnos in the Aegean Sea.

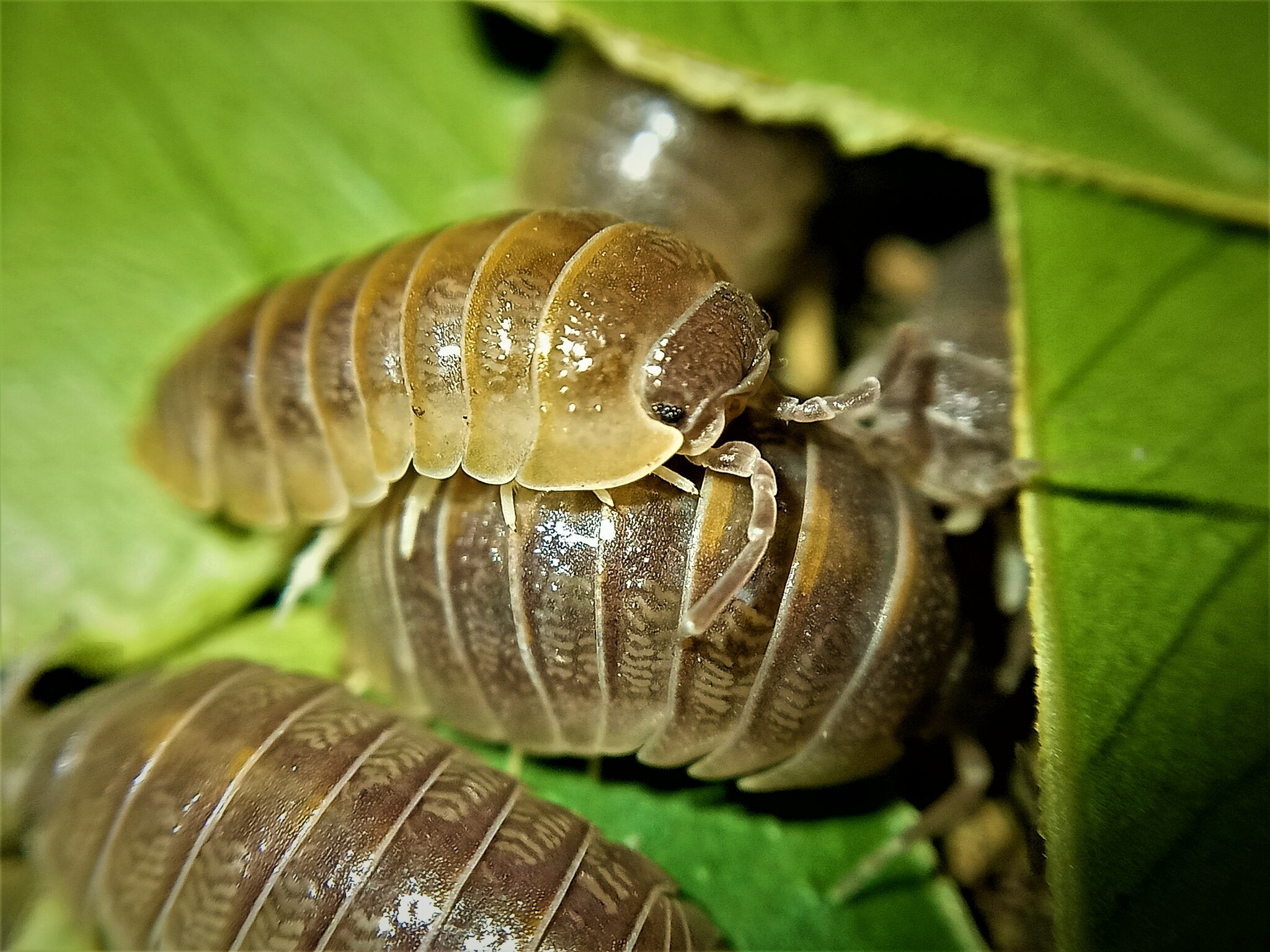
Mating attempt of a male Armadillidium atticum.

== Ecology ==
Armadillidium atticum is a relatively xerophilic species which can be found in various typical Mediterranean habitats, like maquis, phrygana and their intermediate morphs. Additionally, it is synanthropic and can frequently be found in croplands and in or around human settlements.
