= Cable fairing =

Structure attached to a towed cable

A cable fairing is a structure attached to a towed cable designed to streamline the flow around the cable, primarily in marine environments.

Cables are faired primarily for two reasons: (1) to reduce normal drag and thus achieve more depth for a given cable scope and speed; and (2) to eliminate cable vibration caused by vortex shedding, commonly known as cable strum.

Another approach is to design a cable with a streamlined profile in order to share the load chordwise and reduce the frontal section.

== Types of cable fairing ==
There are several major types of cable fairing:

- Hard fairing: essentially a streamlined teardrop-shaped shell clamped in sections over the cable;
- Ribbon fairing: flexible ribbons attached to the cable that assume a streamlined shape, or break the coherence in vortex shedding when towed;
- Hairy fairing: similar to ribbon fairing, but the “ribbons” take the form of hair-like flexible structures.

All cables (faired or unfaired) have hydrodynamic drag coefficient and loading functions. These describe the variation in drag/lift coefficients (or normal/tangential force coefficients) as a function of angle $a$ with respect to the flow. As an example, the loading function for the normal drag coefficient of an unfaired cable, represented as a flexible circular cylinder, is $\textstyle\sin^{2}{\alpha}$ ($\alpha = 90^{\circ}$ means that the cable is normal to the flow).

== Performance ==
Cylindrical cables have drag coefficient above 1.1 (higher when strumming).

Aspect ratio of fairings is limited by stability issues. Fairings section tested in basin can lower the drag coefficients to 0.02, but drag coefficients around 0.2 are known to have been reached at sea.

== Operational complexities ==
Fairing a cable can increase the complexity of the handling system. An unfaired cable can be wrapped many times on a winch drum. Some types of faired cable may only permit a single wrap.

Furthermore, many types of hard fairing require the use of anti-stacking rings. When under tension, the diameter of a steel-armored cable gets smaller. This in turn would cause the fairing sections to loosen and slide down the cable (until they “stack” at the aft end) without the use of the anti-stacking rings.
