= Vivace (disambiguation) =

Vivace is a musical tempo marking.

Vivace may also refer to:

- VIVACE, an alternative name for Vortex power, a form of hydro power
- USS Vivace, a United States Navy ship
