= Stockbridge damper =

Tuned mass damper used to suppress wind-induced vibrations

A Stockbridge damper is a tuned mass damper used to suppress wind-induced vibrations on slender structures such as overhead power lines, long cantilevered signs and cable-stayed bridges. The dumbbell-shaped device consists of two masses at the ends of a short length of cable or flexible rod, which is clamped at its middle to the main cable. The damper is designed to dissipate the energy of oscillations in the main cable to an acceptable level.

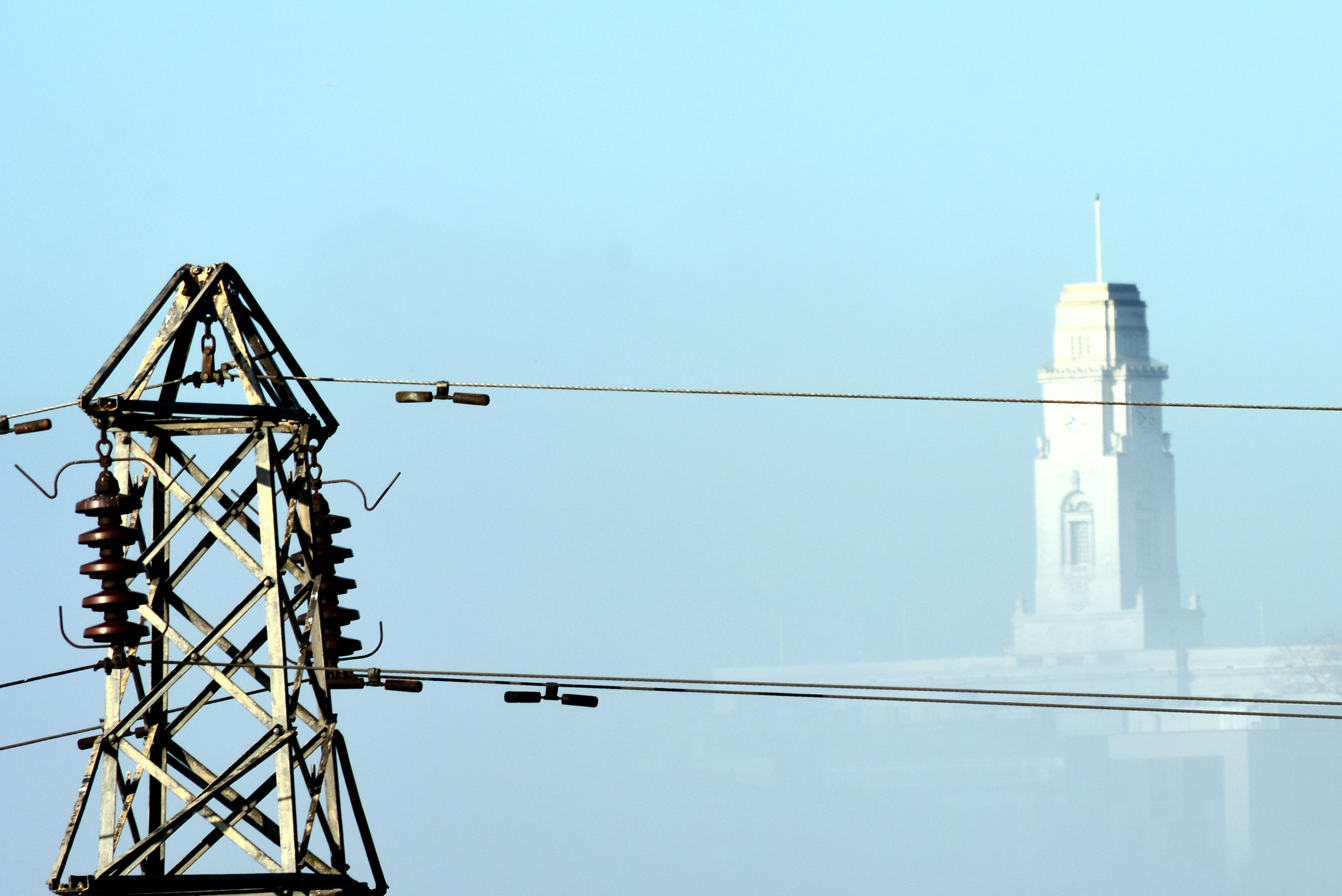
Stockbridge dampers installed on high voltage power lines

== Wind-induced oscillation ==
Wind can generate three major modes of oscillation in suspended cables:

- Gallop has an amplitude measured in metres and a frequency range of 0.08 to 3 Hz
- Aeolian vibration (sometimes termed flutter) has an amplitude of millimetres to centimetres and a frequency of 3 to 150 Hz
- Wake-induced vibration has an amplitude of centimetres and a frequency of 0.15 to 10 Hz

The Stockbridge damper targets oscillations due to aeolian vibration; it is less effective outside this amplitude and frequency range. Aeolian vibration occurs in the vertical plane and is caused by alternating shedding of vortices on the leeward side of the cable. A steady but moderate wind can induce a standing wave pattern on the line consisting of several wavelengths per span. Aeolian vibration causes damaging stress fatigue to the cable and represents the principal cause of failure of conductor strands. The ends of a power line span, where it is clamped to the transmission towers, are at most risk. The effect becomes more pronounced with increased cable tension, as its natural self-damping is reduced.

== Description ==
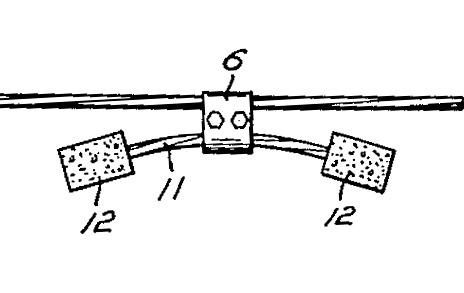
Stockbridge's original concrete block design

The Stockbridge damper was invented in the 1920s by George H. Stockbridge, who was an engineer for Southern California Edison. Stockbridge obtained US patent 1675391 on 3 July 1928 for a "vibration damper". His patent described three means of damping vibrations on lines: a sack of metal punchings tied to the line; a short length of cable clamped parallel to the main cable; and a short (30 in, 75 cm) cable with a concrete mass fixed at each end. This last device developed into the widely used Stockbridge damper.

Vibrations in the main cable were passed down through the clamp and into the shorter damper, or "messenger", cable. This would flex and cause the symmetrically placed concrete blocks at its ends to oscillate. Careful choice of the mass of the blocks, and the stiffness and length of the damper cable would match the mechanical impedance of the damper to that of the line, and greatly attenuate oscillation of the main cable. Since Stockbridge dampers were economical, effective and easy to install, they became used routinely on overhead lines. Live-line working using hot stick tools meant it was possible to retrofit dampers to lines while energised.

== Modern designs ==
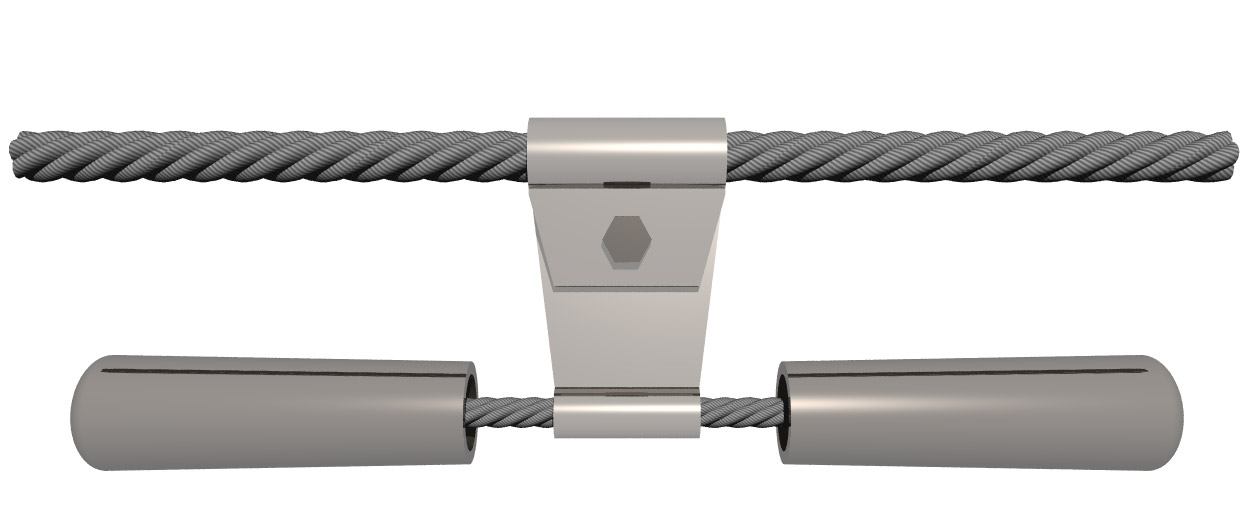
A modern design with metal weights

Modern designs use metal bell-shaped weights rather than Stockbridge's concrete blocks. The bell is hollow and the damper cable is fixed internally to the distal end, which permits relative motion between the cable and damping weights. To provide for greater freedom of motion, the weights may be partially slotted in the vertical plane, allowing the cable to travel outside the confines of the bell. Some more complex designs use weights with asymmetric mass distribution, which enables the damper to oscillate in several different frequency modes and ranges.

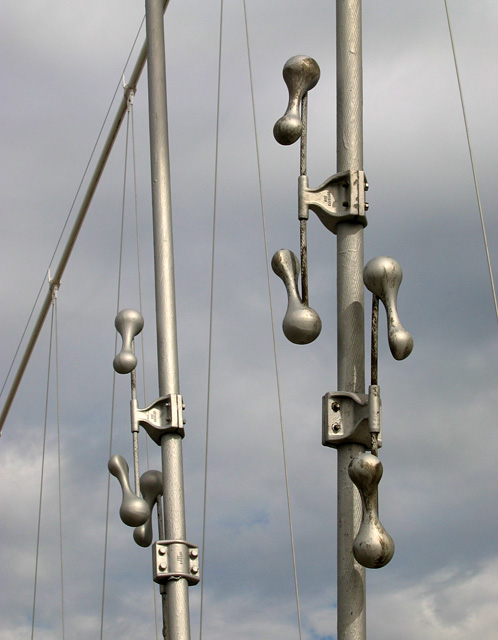
Dogbone dampers on the road-support cables of the Severn Bridge

Another modern design is the Dogbone invented by Philip Dulhunty in 1976. It is so called due to its configuration, a larger metal sphere attached to the end of the damper, with a smaller sphere projecting sideways from it, resembling a dog's bone. The damper offsets the weights sideways in order to introduce a third degree of freedom, twisting the damper cable in addition to bending it up and down. Additional intra-strand friction was created in the damper cable, dissipating significantly more energy.

The most vulnerable section of the cable is where it is clamped to the end of an insulator string, so dampers are typically installed at the nearest anti-nodes (points of maximum displacement) either side of the clamp. There are thus normally two dampers per span, though more can be installed if necessary on longer spans.

Overhead transmission lines form a catenary for which vibration is predominantly in the vertical plane. When more than one plane of vibration is anticipated, Stockbridge dampers may be mounted at right angles to each other. This is common when the cable runs in a vertical or off-horizontal plane, for example in cable-stayed bridges or radio mast guy-wires.

== See also ==
- Conductor gallop
- Tacoma Narrows Bridge - destruction once thought to be a case of resonance
