= Drag crisis =

Phenomenon in fluid dynamics

The drag coefficient of a sphere drops at high Reynolds number (number 5 on the graph). The effect occurs at lower Reynolds numbers when the ball is rough (such as a golf ball with dimples) than when it is smooth (such as a table tennis ball).

In fluid dynamics, the drag crisis (also known as the Eiffel paradox) is a phenomenon in which drag coefficient drops off suddenly as Reynolds number increases. This has been well studied for round bodies like spheres and cylinders. The drag coefficient of a sphere will change rapidly from about 0.5 to 0.2 at a Reynolds number in the range of 300000. This corresponds to the point where the flow pattern changes, leaving a narrower turbulent wake. The behavior is highly dependent on small differences in the condition of the surface of the sphere.

== History ==
The drag crisis was observed by Nikolay Zhukovsky, who guessed that this paradox can be explained by the detachment of streamlines at different points of the sphere at different velocities.

Later the paradox was independently discovered in experiments by Gustave Eiffel and Charles Maurain. Upon Eiffel's retirement, he built the first wind tunnel in a lab located at the base of the Eiffel Tower, to investigate wind loads on structures and early aircraft. In a series of tests he found that the force loading experienced an abrupt decline at a critical Reynolds number.

The paradox was explained from boundary-layer theory by German fluid dynamicist Ludwig Prandtl.

== Explanation ==
The drag crisis is associated with a transition from laminar to turbulent boundary layer flow adjacent to the object. For cylindrical structures, this transition is associated with a transition from well-organized vortex shedding to randomized shedding behavior for super-critical Reynolds numbers, eventually returning to well-organized shedding at a higher Reynolds number with a return to elevated drag force coefficients.

The super-critical behavior can be described semi-empirically using statistical means or by sophisticated computational fluid dynamics software (CFD) that takes into account the fluid-structure interaction for the given fluid conditions using Large Eddy Simulation (LES) that includes the dynamic displacements of the structure (DLES) [11]. These calculations also demonstrate the importance of the blockage ratio present for intrusive fittings in pipe flow and wind-tunnel tests.

The critical Reynolds number is a function of turbulence intensity, upstream velocity profile, and wall-effects (velocity gradients). The semi-empirical descriptions of the drag crisis are often described in terms of a Strouhal bandwidth and the vortex shedding is described by broad-band spectral content.

== Additional reading ==
1. Fung, Y.C. (1960). "Fluctuating Lift and Drag Acting on a Cylinder in a Flow at Supercritical Reynolds Numbers," J. Aerospace Sci., 27 (11), pp. 801–814.
2. Roshko, A. (1961). "Experiments on the flow past a circular cylinder at very high Reynolds number," J. Fluid Mech., 10, pp. 345–356.
3. Jones, G.W. (1968). "Aerodynamic Forces on Stationary and Oscillating Circular Cylinder at High Reynolds Numbers," ASME Symposium on Unsteady Flow, Fluids Engineering Div., pp. 1–30.
4. Jones, G.W., Cincotta, J.J., Walker, R.W. (1969). "Aerodynamic Forces on Stationary and Oscillating Circular Cylinder at High Reynolds Numbers," NASA Report TAR-300, pp. 1–66.
5. Achenbach, E. Heinecke, E. (1981). "On vortex shedding from smooth and rough cylinders in the range of Reynolds numbers 6x103 to 5x106," J. Fluid Mech. 109, pp. 239–251.
6. Schewe, G. (1983). "On the force fluctuations acting on a circular cylinder in crossflow from subcritical up to transcritical Raynolds numbers," J. Fluid Mech., 133, pp. 265–285.
7. Kawamura, T., Nakao, T., Takahashi, M., Hayashi, T., Murayama, K., Gotoh, N., (2003). "Synchronized Vibrations of a Circular Cylinder in Cross Flow at Supercritical Reynolds Numbers", ASME J. Press. Vessel Tech., 125, pp. 97–108, DOI:10.1115/1.1526855.
8. Zdravkovich, M.M. (1997). Flow Around Circular Cylinders, Vol.I, Oxford Univ. Press. Reprint 2007, p. 188.
9. Zdravkovich, M.M. (2003). Flow Around Circular Cylinders, Vol. II, Oxford Univ. Press. Reprint 2009, p. 761.
10. Bartran, D. (2015). "Support Flexibility and Natural Frequencies of Pipe Mounted Thermowells," ASME J. Press. Vess. Tech., 137, pp. 1–6, DOI:10.1115/1.4028863
11. Botterill, N. ( 2010). "Fluid structure interaction modelling of cables used in civil engineering structures," PhD dissertation (http://etheses.nottingham.ac.uk/11657/), University of Nottingham.
12. Bartran, D. (2018). "The Drag Crisis and Thermowell Design", J. Press. Ves. Tech. 140(4), 044501, Paper No: PVT-18-1002. DOI: 10.1115/1.4039882.
