= Vortex power =

Vortex power is a form of hydro power which generates energy by placing obstacles in rivers and oceans to cause the formation of vortices which can then be tapped into a usable form of energy such as electricity. An example of this method has been created by a team at the University of Michigan who call the technology VIVACE or Vortex Induced Vibrations Aquatic Clean Energy. This technology has an expected life span of 10-20 years, which could meet life cycle cost targets.

== Environmental impacts ==
As of right now, this technology seems to be nonpolluting and low maintenance. In addition, it does not have any major impact on wildlife such as fish or other animals. This form of power is still in the developmental research stage and is currently undergoing optimization experiments before it can be implemented.

== See also ==
- Hydropower
- Renewable energy
- Vortex induced vibration
