= Drag coefficient =

Dimensionless parameter to quantify fluid resistance

Drag coefficients in fluids with Reynolds number approximately 10^4 Shapes are depicted with the same projected frontal area

In fluid dynamics, the drag coefficient (commonly denoted as: $c_\mathrm{d}$, $c_x$ or $c_{\rm w}$) is a dimensionless quantity that is used to quantify the drag or resistance of an object in a fluid environment, such as air or water. It is used in the drag equation in which a lower drag coefficient indicates the object will have less aerodynamic or hydrodynamic drag. The drag coefficient is always associated with a reference area. With the exception of spheres it is also associated with the orientation of the object relative to the direction of the flowing fluid.

The drag coefficient of any object comprises the effects of the two basic contributors to fluid dynamic drag: skin friction and form drag. The drag coefficient of a lifting airfoil or hydrofoil also includes the effects of lift-induced drag. The drag coefficient of a complete structure such as an aircraft also includes the effects of interference drag.

== Definition ==
Table of drag coefficients in increasing order, of 2D shapes between walls (right column) and 3D shapes (left column), depicted with the same projected frontal area, at Reynolds numbers between 10^{4} and 10^{6} with flow from the left

The drag coefficient $c_\mathrm d$ is defined as

$$c_\mathrm d = \dfrac{ 2F_\mathrm d}{ \rho u^2 A}$$

where:

- $F_\mathrm d$ is the drag force, which is by definition the force component in the direction of the flow velocity;
- $\rho$ is the mass density of the fluid;
- $u$ is the flow speed of the object relative to the fluid;
- $A$ is the reference area

The reference area depends on what type of drag coefficient is being measured. For automobiles and many other objects, the reference area is the vehicle's projected frontal area. This may not be the vehicle's cross-sectional area, depending on where the cross-section is measured. For example, for a sphere $A = \pi r^2$ (note this is not the surface area = $4 \pi r^2$).

For airfoils, the reference area is the nominal wing area. Since this tends to be large compared to the frontal area, the resulting drag coefficients tend to be low, much lower than for a car with the same drag, frontal area, and speed.

Airships and some bodies of revolution use the volumetric drag coefficient, in which the reference area is the square of the cube root of the airship volume (volume to the two-thirds power). Submerged streamlined bodies use the wetted surface area.

Two objects with the same reference area moving at the same speed through a fluid will experience drag forces proportional to their respective drag coefficients. Coefficients for unstreamlined objects can be 1 or more, for streamlined objects, much less.

== Cauchy momentum equation ==
In the non-dimensional form of the Cauchy momentum equation, the skin drag coefficient or skin friction coefficient is referred to the transversal area (the area normal to the drag force, so the coefficient is locally defined as:

$$c_\mathrm d  = \dfrac \tau q= \dfrac{ 2 \tau}{ \rho u^2}$$

where:

- $\tau$ is the local shear stress, which is by definition the stress component in the direction of the local flow velocity;
- $q$ is the local dynamic pressure of the fluid
- $\rho$ is the local mass density of the fluid;
- $u$ is the local flow speed of the fluid

== Background ==
Flow around a plate, showing stagnation. The force in the upper configuration is equal to $F = \frac {1}{2} \rho u^2 A$ and in the lower configuration $F_d = \tfrac12 \rho u^2 c_d A$

The drag equation
$$F_{\rm d} = \tfrac12 \rho u^2 c_{\rm d} A$$
is essentially a statement that the drag force on any object is proportional to the density of the fluid and proportional to the square of the relative flow speed between the object and the fluid. The factor of $1/2$ comes from the dynamic pressure of the fluid, which is equal to the kinetic energy density.

The value of $c_\mathrm d$ is not a constant but varies as a function of flow speed, flow direction, object position, object size, fluid density and fluid viscosity. Speed, kinematic viscosity and a characteristic length scale of the object are incorporated into a dimensionless quantity called the Reynolds number $\mathrm{Re}$. $c_\mathrm d$ is thus a function of $\mathrm{Re}$. In a compressible flow, the speed of sound is relevant, and $c_\mathrm d$ is also a function of Mach number $\mathrm{Ma}$.

For certain body shapes, the drag coefficient $c_\mathrm d$ only depends on the Reynolds number $\mathrm{Re}$, Mach number $\mathrm{Ma}$ and the direction of the flow. For low Mach number $\mathrm{Ma}$, the drag coefficient is independent of Mach number. Also, the variation with Reynolds number $\mathrm{Re}$ within a practical range of interest is usually small, while for cars at highway speed and aircraft at cruising speed, the incoming flow direction is also more-or-less the same. Therefore, the drag coefficient $c_\mathrm d$ can often be treated as a constant.

For a streamlined body to achieve a low drag coefficient, the boundary layer around the body must remain attached to the surface of the body for as long as possible, causing the wake to be narrow. A high form drag results in a broad wake. The boundary layer will transition from laminar to turbulent if Reynolds number of the flow around the body is sufficiently great. Larger velocities, larger objects, and lower viscosities contribute to larger Reynolds numbers.

Drag coefficient $C_d$ for a sphere as a function of Reynolds number Re, as obtained from laboratory experiments. The dark line is for a sphere with a smooth surface, while the lighter line is for the case of a rough surface. The numbers along the line indicate several flow regimes and associated changes in the drag coefficient: •2: attached flow (Stokes flow) and steady separated flow, •3: separated unsteady flow, having a laminar flow boundary layer upstream of the separation, and producing a vortex street, •4: separated unsteady flow with a laminar boundary layer at the upstream side, before flow separation, with downstream of the sphere a chaotic turbulent wake, •5: post-critical separated flow, with a turbulent boundary layer.

For other objects, such as small particles, one can no longer consider that the drag coefficient $c_\mathrm d$ is constant, but certainly is a function of Reynolds number. At a low Reynolds number, the flow around the object does not transition to turbulent but remains laminar, even up to the point at which it separates from the surface of the object. At very low Reynolds numbers, without flow separation, the drag force $F_\mathrm d$ is proportional to $v$ instead of $v^2$; for a sphere this is known as Stokes' law. The Reynolds number will be low for small objects, low velocities, and high viscosity fluids.

A $c_\mathrm d$ equal to 1 would be obtained in a case where all of the fluid approaching the object is brought to rest, building up stagnation pressure over the whole front surface. The top figure shows a flat plate with the fluid coming from the right and stopping at the plate. The graph to the left of it shows equal pressure across the surface. In a real flat plate, the fluid must turn around the sides, and full stagnation pressure is found only at the center, dropping off toward the edges as in the lower figure and graph. Only considering the front side, the $c_\mathrm d$ of a real flat plate would be less than 1; except that there will be suction on the backside: a negative pressure (relative to ambient). The overall $c_\mathrm d$ of a real square flat plate perpendicular to the flow is often given as 1.17. Flow patterns and therefore $c_\mathrm d$ for some shapes can change with the Reynolds number and the roughness of the surfaces.

== Drag coefficient examples ==
=== General ===
In general, $c_\mathrm d$ is not an absolute constant for a given body shape. It varies with the speed of airflow (or more generally with Reynolds number $\mathrm{Re}$). A smooth sphere, for example, has a $c_\mathrm d$ that varies from high values for laminar flow to 0.47 for turbulent flow. Although the drag coefficient decreases with increasing $\mathrm{Re}$, the drag force increases.

$c_d$	Item
0.001	Laminar flat plate parallel to the flow ($\mathrm{Re} < 10^6$)
0.005	Turbulent flat plate parallel to the flow ($\mathrm{Re} > 10^6$)
0.1	Smooth sphere ($\mathrm{Re} = 10^6$)
0.47	Rough sphere ($\mathrm{Re} = 10^6$)
0.81	Triangular trapeze (45°)
0.9-1.7	Trapeze with triangular basis (45°)
0.295	Bullet (not ogive, at subsonic velocity)
1.0–1.1	Skier
1.0–1.3	Wires and cables
1.0–1.3	Adult human (upright position)
1.1-1.3	Ski jumper
1.28	Flat plate perpendicular to flow (3D)
1.3–1.5	Empire State Building
1.8–2.0	Eiffel Tower
1.98–2.05	Long flat plate perpendicular to flow (2D)

=== Aircraft ===
As noted above, aircraft use their wing area as the reference area when computing $c_\mathrm d$, while automobiles (and many other objects) use projected frontal area; thus, coefficients are not directly comparable between these classes of vehicles. In the aerospace industry, the drag coefficient is sometimes expressed in drag counts where 1 drag count = 0.0001 of a $c_\mathrm d$.

c_{d}	Drag Count	Aircraft type
0.021	210	F-4 Phantom II (subsonic)
0.022	220	Learjet 24
0.024	240	Boeing 787
0.0265	265	Airbus A380
0.027	270	Cessna 172/182
0.027	270	Cessna 310
0.031	310	Boeing 747
0.044	440	F-4 Phantom II (supersonic)
0.048	480	F-104 Starfighter

== Blunt and streamlined body flows ==
=== Concept ===
The force between a fluid and a body, when there is relative motion, can only be transmitted by normal pressure and tangential friction stresses. So, for the whole body, the drag part of the force, which is in-line with the approaching fluid motion, is composed of frictional drag (viscous drag) and pressure drag (form drag). The total drag and component drag forces can be related as follows:

$$\begin{align}
c_\mathrm d &= \dfrac{2 F_\mathrm d}{\rho v^2 A}\\
&= c_\mathrm p + c_\mathrm f \\
&= \underbrace{ \dfrac{2}{\rho v^2 A} \displaystyle \int_{S} \mathrm{d}S  (p-p_o) \left(\hat{\mathbf{n}} \sdot \hat{\mathbf{i}}\right) }_{ c_\mathrm p }+ \underbrace{ \dfrac{2}{\rho v^2 A} \displaystyle \int_{S} \mathrm{d}S  \left(\hat{\mathbf{t}} \sdot \hat{\mathbf{i}}\right) T_{\rm w} }_{ c_\mathrm f}
\end{align}$$

where:

- $A$ is the planform area of the body,
- $S$ is the wetted area of the body,
- $c_\mathrm p$ is the pressure drag coefficient,
- $c_\mathrm f$ is the friction drag coefficient,
- $p_\mathrm o$ is the pressure far away from the body (note that this constant does not affect the final result),
- $p$ is pressure at surface dS,
- $\hat{\mathbf{i}}$ is the unit vector in direction of free stream flow
- $\hat \mathbf{n}$ is the unit vector in the direction perpendicular to the body surface dS, pointing from the fluid to the solid,
- $\hat \mathbf{t}$ is the unit vector in the direction of the shear stress acting on the body surface dS,
- $T_\mathrm w$ is the magnitude of the shear stress acting on the body surface dS,

Therefore, when the drag is dominated by a frictional component, the body is called a streamlined body, while in the case of dominant pressure drag, the body is called a blunt or bluff body. Thus, the shape of the body and the angle of attack determine the type of drag. For example, an airfoil is considered a body with a small angle of attack by the fluid flowing across it. This means that it has attached boundary layers, which produce much less pressure drag. The wake produced is very small and drag is dominated by the friction component. Therefore, such a body (here an airfoil) is described as streamlined, whereas for bodies with fluid flow at high angles of attack, boundary layer separation takes place. This mainly occurs due to adverse pressure gradients at the top and rear parts of an airfoil.

Trade-off relationship between zero-lift drag and lift induced drag

As a result, wake formation occurs, leading to eddy formation and pressure loss due to pressure drag. In such situations, the airfoil is stalled and has higher pressure drag than friction drag. In this case, the body is described as a blunt body.

A streamlined body looks like a fish (tuna), Oropesa, etc. or an airfoil with small angle of attack, whereas a blunt body looks like a brick, a cylinder or an airfoil with high angle of attack. For a given frontal area and velocity, a streamlined body will have lower resistance than a blunt body. Cylinders and spheres are taken as blunt bodies because the drag is dominated by the pressure component in the wake region at high Reynolds number.

To reduce this drag, either the flow separation could be reduced or the surface area in contact with the fluid could be reduced (to reduce friction drag). This reduction is necessary in devices like cars, bicycle, etc. to avoid vibration and noise production.

== See also ==
- Automotive aerodynamics
- Automobile drag coefficient
- Ballistic coefficient
- Drag crisis
- Zero-lift drag coefficient
