= Vincenc Strouhal =

Czech physicist

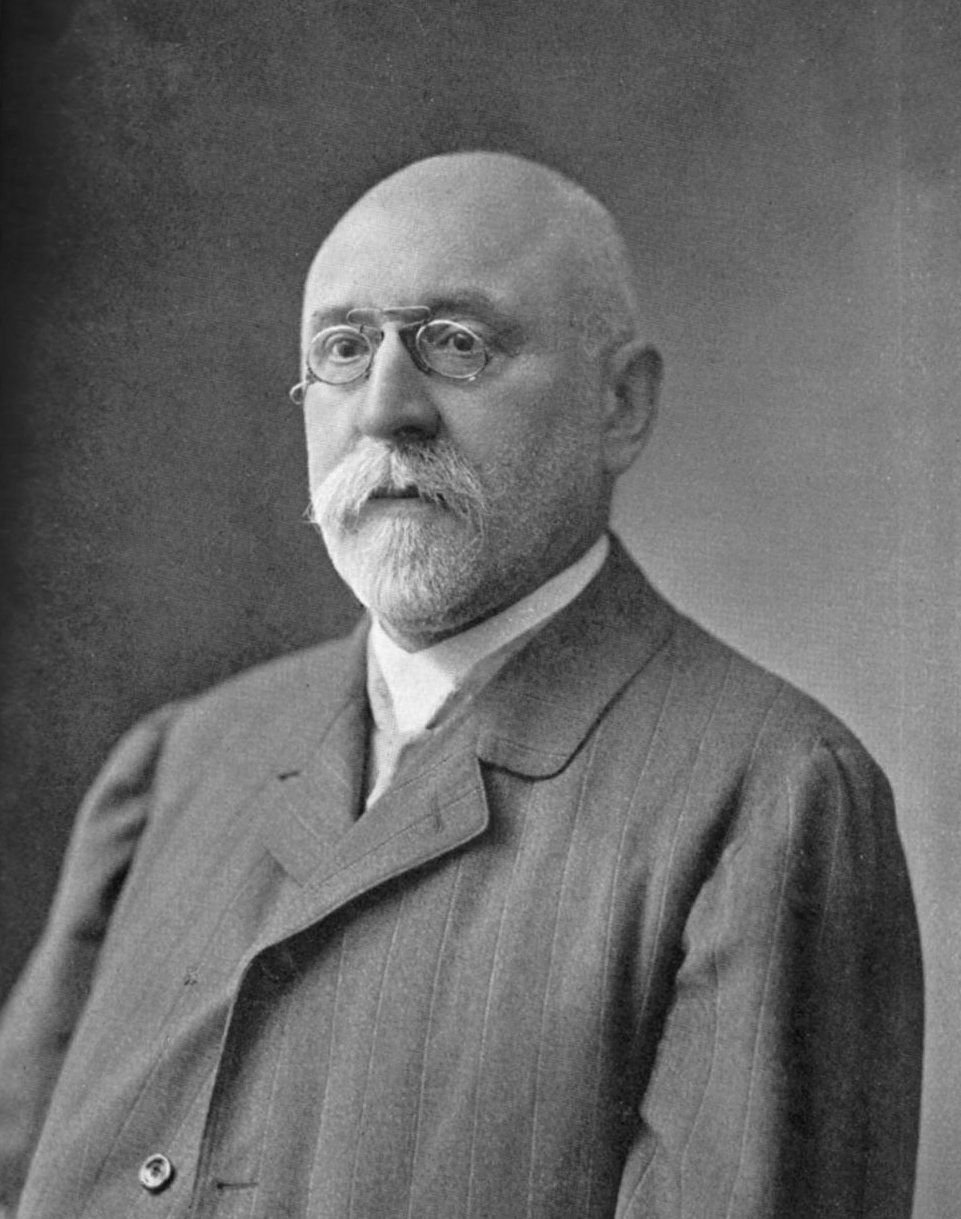
Vincenc Strouhal

Vincenc Strouhal (Čeněk Strouhal) (10 April 1850 in Seč – 26 January 1922 in Prague) was a Czech physicist specializing in experimental physics. He was one of the founders of the Institute of Physics of the Czech part of Charles University. He was engaged in hydrodynamic phenomena, acoustics and electric and magnetic properties of steel.

== Strouhal number ==
Strouhal's major contribution to the fundamentals of fluid mechanics was his discovery in 1878 of the Strouhal number (St). This dimensionless number describing oscillating flow mechanisms was discovered by Strouhal while experimenting in 1878 with wires experiencing vortex shedding and singing in the wind.

== Named after Strouhal ==
- 7391 Strouhal, a minor planet named after Strouhal in 1983 by the Czech astronomer Antonín Mrkos.
- Since 1998, ceremonial Strouhal's lecture is held every year at the Faculty of Mathematics and Physics, Charles University, in a lecture hall named after him.
