= Vortex shedding =

Oscillating flow effect resulting from fluid passing over a blunt body

Vortex shedding behind a circular cylinder. In this animation, the flows on the two sides of the cylinder are shown in different colors, to show that the vortices from the two sides alternate.

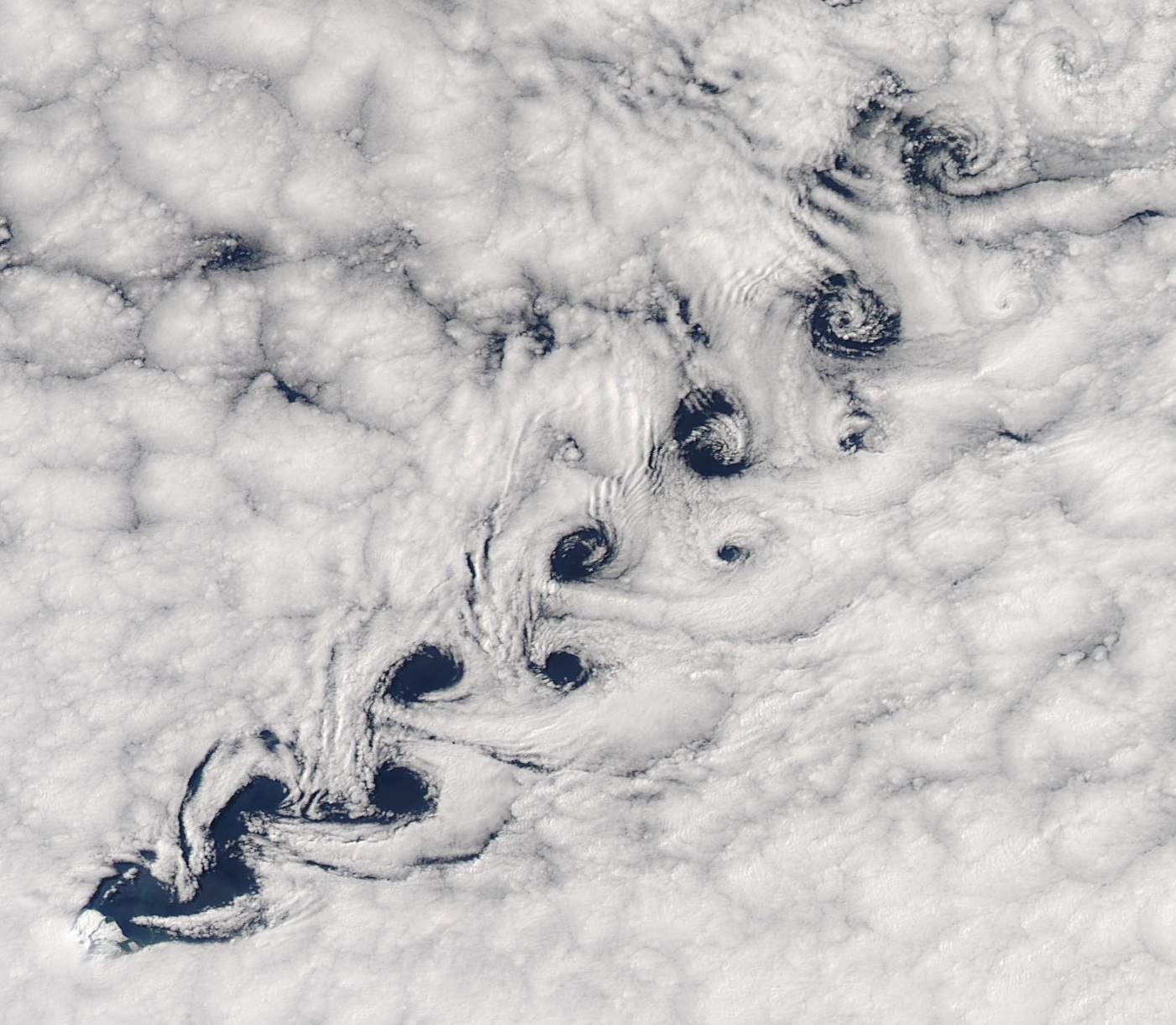
Vortex shedding as winds pass Heard Island (bottom left) in the southern Indian Ocean resulted in this Kármán vortex street in the clouds

In fluid dynamics, vortex shedding is an oscillating flow that takes place when a fluid such as air or water flows past a bluff (as opposed to streamlined) body at certain velocities, depending on the size and shape of the body. In this flow, vortices are created at the back of the body and detach periodically from either side of the body forming a Kármán vortex street. The fluid flow past the object creates alternating low-pressure vortices on the downstream side of the object. The object will tend to move toward the low-pressure zone.

If the bluff structure is not mounted rigidly and the frequency of vortex shedding matches the resonance frequency of the structure, then the structure can begin to resonate, vibrating with harmonic oscillations driven by the energy of the flow. This vibration is the cause for overhead power line wires humming in the wind, and for the fluttering of automobile whip radio antennas at some speeds. Tall chimneys constructed of thin-walled steel tubes can be sufficiently flexible that, in air flow with a speed in the critical range, vortex shedding can drive the chimney into violent oscillations that can damage or destroy the chimney.

Vortex shedding was one of the causes proposed for the failure of the original Tacoma Narrows Bridge (Galloping Gertie) in 1940, but was rejected because the frequency of the vortex shedding did not match that of the bridge. The bridge actually failed by aeroelastic flutter.

A thrill ride, "VertiGo" at Cedar Point in Sandusky, Ohio suffered vortex shedding during the winter of 2001, causing one of the three towers to collapse. The ride was closed for the winter at the time. In northeastern Iran, the Hashemi-Nejad natural gas refinery's flare stacks suffered vortex shedding seven times from 1975 to 2003. Some simulation and analyses were done, which revealed that the main cause was the interaction of the pilot flame and flare stack. The problem was solved by removing the pilot.

== Dimensional frequency of vortex shedding ==
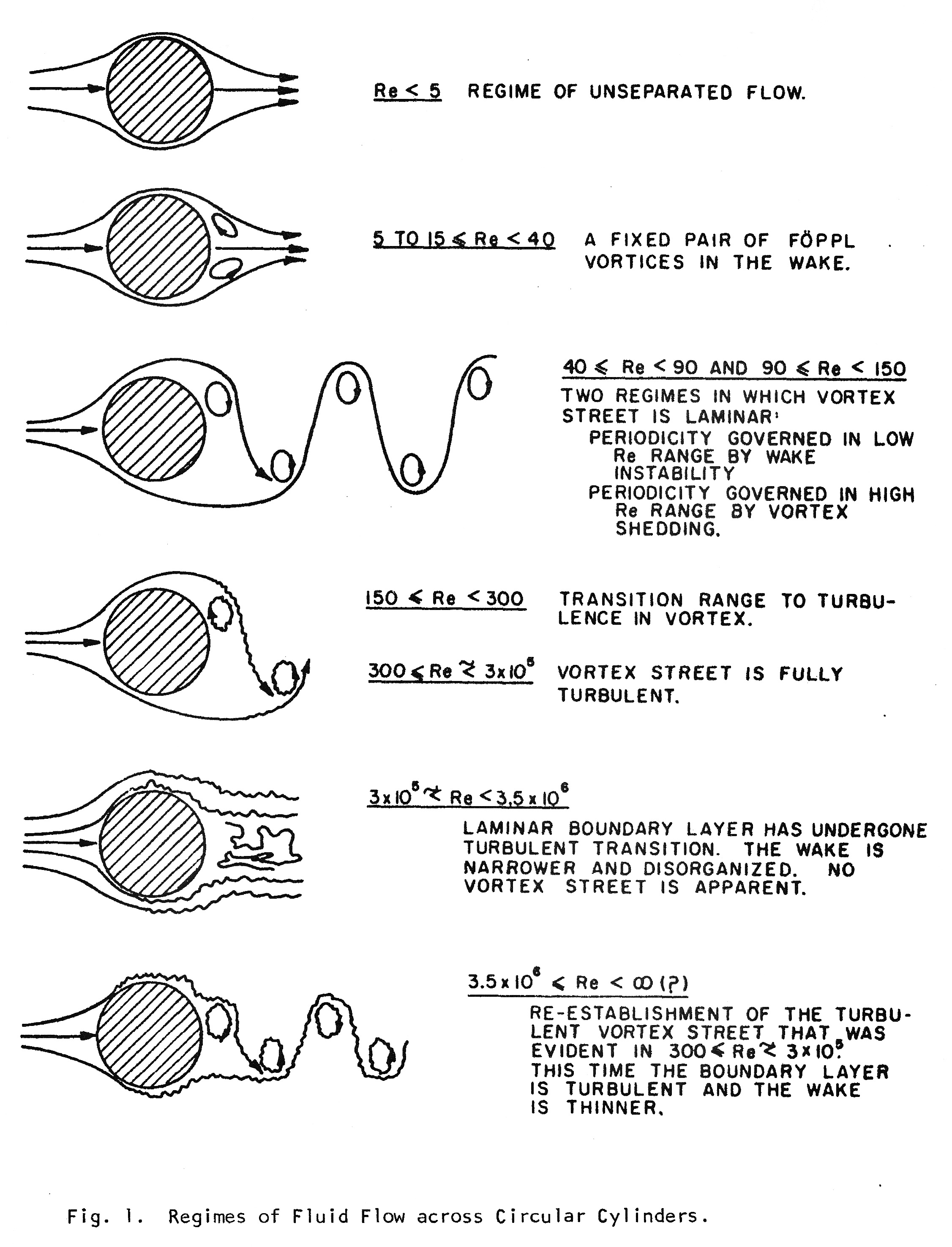
Regimes of fluid flow across circular cylinder

The frequency at which vortex shedding takes place for a cylinder is related to the flow velocity, cylinder diameter, and fluid properties by the following equation:

$$\mathrm{St} = \frac{f \cdot D}{V} = \mathrm{fn}(\mathrm{Re}_D)$$

Here, $\mathrm{St}$ is the dimensionless Strouhal number, $f$ is the vortex shedding frequency (Hz), $D$ is the diameter of the cylinder (m), and $V$ is the flow velocity (m/s). The Strouhal number is a function of the dimensionless Reynolds number $\mathrm{Re}_D = \rho V D/\mu$, where $\rho$ is the fluid's density (kg/m^{3}) and $\mu$ [kg-m/s] is the fluid's dynamic viscosity. However, over four orders of magnitude in Reynolds number, from 10^{2} to 10^{5}, the Strouhal number varies only between 0.18 and 0.22.

As both the Strouhal and Reynolds numbers are dimensionless, any consistent set of units can be used for the variables.

== Mitigation of vortex shedding effects ==
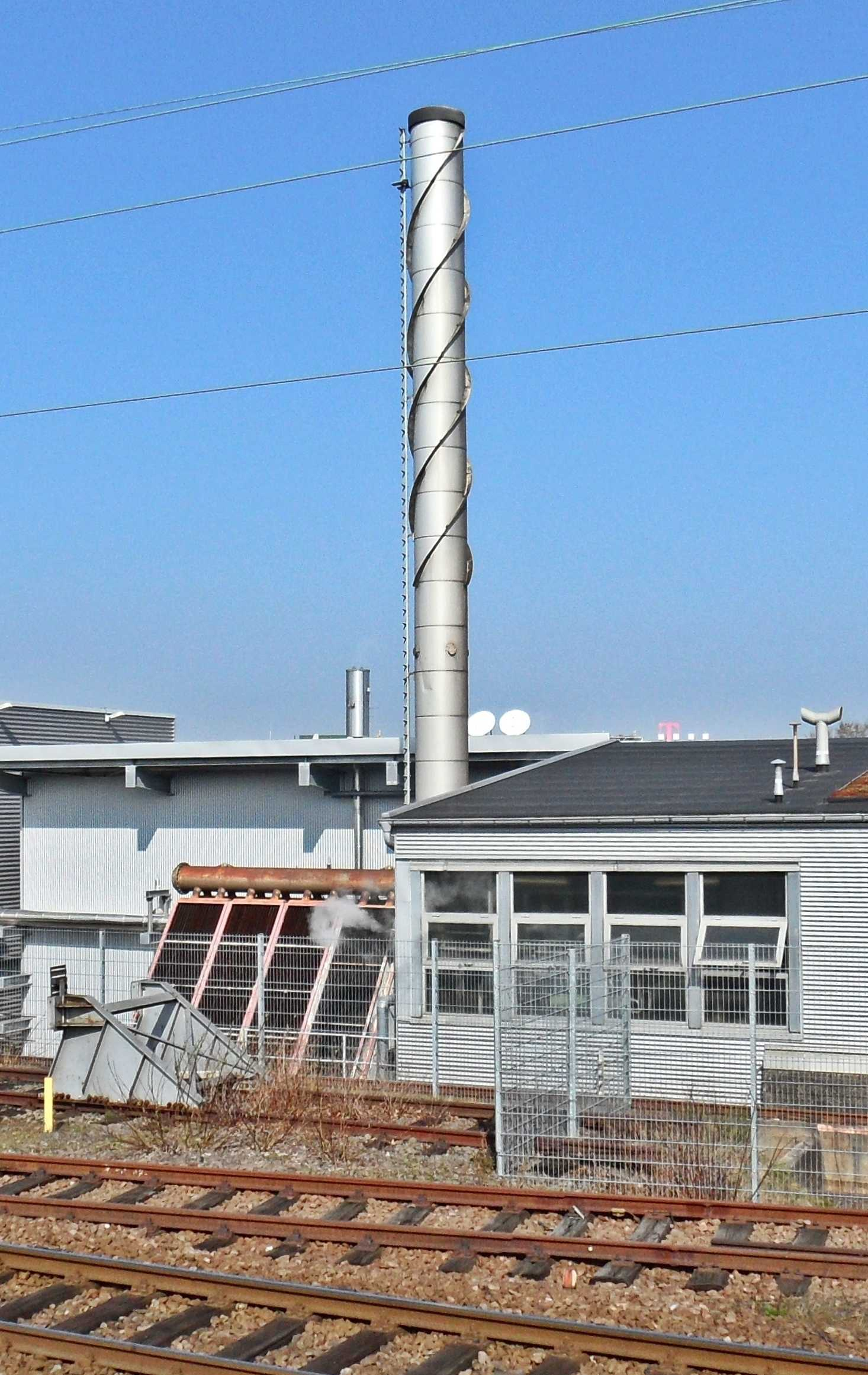
A helical strake on a chimney stack

Fairings can be fitted to a structure to streamline the flow past the structure, such as on an aircraft wing.

Tall metal smokestacks or other tubular structures such as antenna masts or tethered cables can be fitted with an external corkscrew fin (a strake) to deliberately introduce turbulence, so the load is less variable and resonant load frequencies have negligible amplitudes. The effectiveness of helical strakes for reducing vortex induced vibration was discovered in 1957 by Christopher Scruton and D. E. J. Walshe at the National Physics Laboratory in Great Britain. They are therefore often described as Scruton strakes. For maximum effectiveness in suppression of vortices caused by air flow, each fin or strake should have a height of about 10 percent of the cylinder diameter. The pitch of each fin should be approximately 5 times the cylinder diameter.

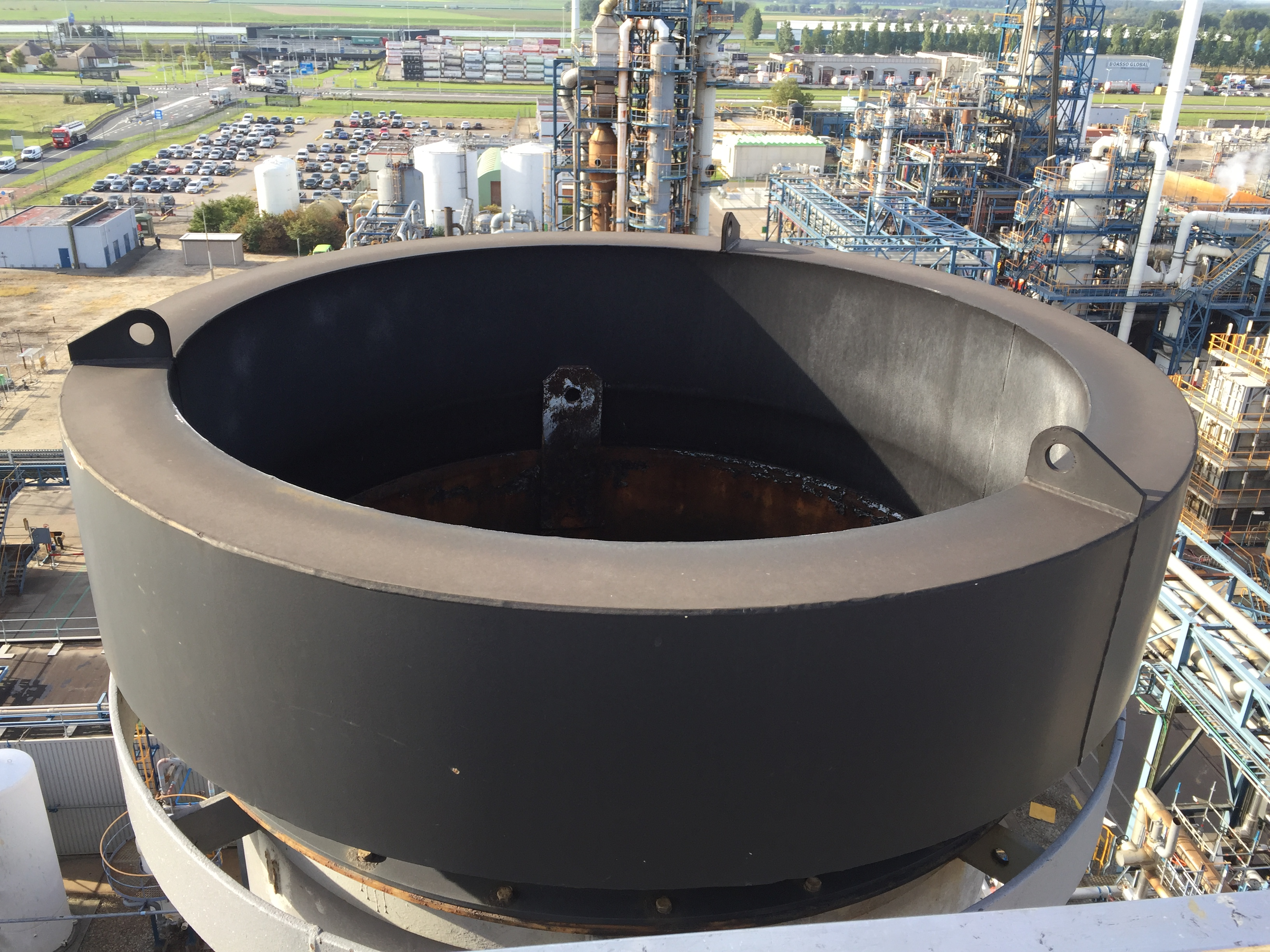
Tuned mass damper on top of a chimney

A tuned mass damper can be used to mitigate vortex shedding in stacks and chimneys.

A Stockbridge damper is used to mitigate aeolian vibrations caused by vortex shedding on overhead power lines.

== See also ==
- Aeroelastic flutter - vibration-induced vortices - by way of contrast
- Von Kármán vortex street
- Vortex
- Vortex-induced vibration
