= Climate of Phoenix =

Phoenix

Climate chart (precipitation, max. and min. temperature)
J	F	M	A	M	J	J	A	S	O	N	D
0.9 68 46	0.9 71 49	0.8 78 55	0.2 86 61	0.1 95 70	0 104 79	0.9 107 85	0.9 105 84	0.6 100 78	0.6 89 66	0.6 77 54	0.7 66 45
- █ Average max. and min. temperatures in °F
- █ Precipitation totals in inches
Metric conversion
J	F	M	A	M	J	J	A	S	O	N	D
22 20 8	22 22 9	21 26 13	5.6 30 16	3.3 35 21	0.5 40 26	23 41 29	24 41 29	14 38 26	14 32 19	14 25 12	19 19 7
- █ Average max. and min. temperatures in °C
- █ Precipitation totals in mm

Phoenix has a hot desert climate (Köppen: BWh), typical of the Sonoran Desert, and is the largest city in the Americas in this climatic zone. Phoenix has long, extremely hot summers and short, mild winters. The city is within one of the world's sunniest regions, with its sunshine duration comparable to the Sahara region. With 3,872 hours of bright sunshine annually, Phoenix receives the most sunshine of any major city on Earth. Average high temperatures in summer are the hottest of any major city in the United States. On average, there are 111 days annually with a high of at least 100 °F (38 °C), including most days from the end of May through late September. Highs top 110 °F (43 °C) an average of 21 days during the year. On June 26, 1990, the temperature reached an all-time recorded high of 122 °F (50 °C).

In 2024, Phoenix-Mesa, AZ, was ranked fifth for most ozone pollution in the United States according to the American Lung Association. Vehicle emissions are cited as precursors to ozone formation. Phoenix also has high levels of particulate pollution, although cities in California lead the nation in this hazard. PM2.5 particulate matter, which is a component of diesel engine exhaust, and larger PM10 particles, which can come from dust, can both reach concerning levels in Phoenix. In fact, people, pets, and other animals exposed to high concentrations of PM10 dust particles―primarily from dust storms or from disturbed agricultural or construction sites―are at risk of contracting Valley Fever, a fungal lung infection.

External videos
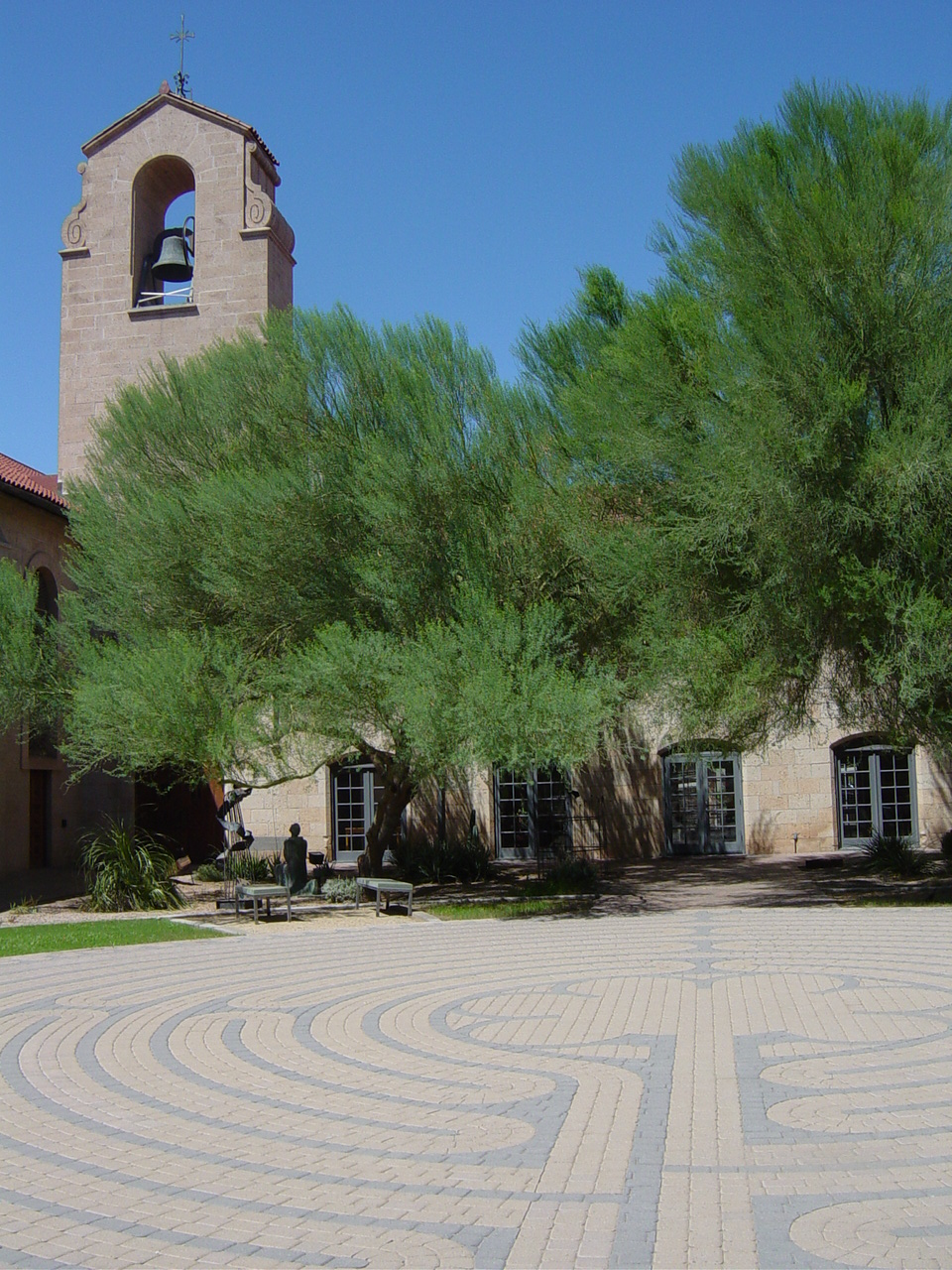
- "Rethinking cities in the face of extreme heat", Mayor Kate Gallego of Phoenix and others, Knowable Magazine, 2022

Unlike most desert locations which have drastic fluctuations between day and nighttime temperatures, the urban heat island effect limits Phoenix's diurnal temperature variation. As the city has expanded, average summer low temperatures have been steadily rising. Pavement, sidewalks, and buildings store the Sun's heat and radiate it at night. The daily normal low remains at or above 80 °F (27 °C) for an average of 74 days per summer. On July 19, 2023, Phoenix set its record for the warmest daily low temperature, at 97 °F (36 °C).

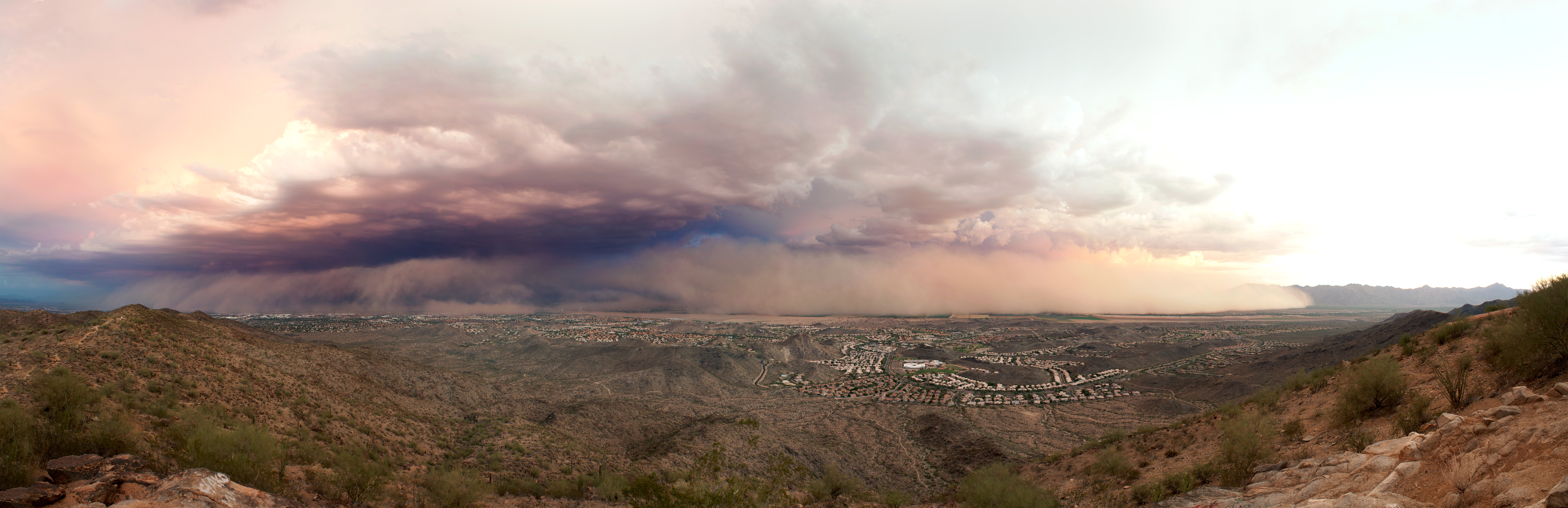
A 2011 haboob

The city averages approximately 300 days of sunshine, or over 85% of daylight hours, per year, and receives scant rainfall―the average annual total at Phoenix Sky Harbor International Airport is 7.22 in (183 mm). The region's trademark dry and sunny weather is interrupted by sporadic Pacific storms in the winter and the arrival of the North American monsoon in the summer. Historically, the monsoon officially started when the average dew point was 55 °F (13 °C) for three days in a row—typically occurring in early July. To increase monsoon awareness and promote safety, however, the National Weather Service decreed that starting in 2008, June 15 would be the official "first day" of the monsoon, and it would end on September 30. When active, the monsoon raises humidity levels and can cause heavy localized precipitation, flash floods, hail, destructive winds, and dust storms—which can rise to the level of a haboob in some years.

August is the wettest month (0.93 in (24 mm)), while June is the driest (0.02 in (0.51 mm)). On September 8, 2014, the city of Phoenix recorded its single highest rainfall total by the National Weather Service with 3.30 in (84 mm), breaking the 75-year-old record of 2.91 in (74 mm), set on September 4, 1939. The September 2014 storm was created from the remnants of Hurricane Norbert which had moved up from the Gulf of California and flooded the city's major interstates and low-lying roadways, stranding hundreds of motorists. On average, dew points range from 31 °F (−1 °C) in April to 58 °F (14 °C) in August. Occasionally, dew points can drop as low as 0 °F (−18 °C), or they can exceed 70 °F (21 °C) during periods of strong monsoon activity—creating muggy conditions in the area.

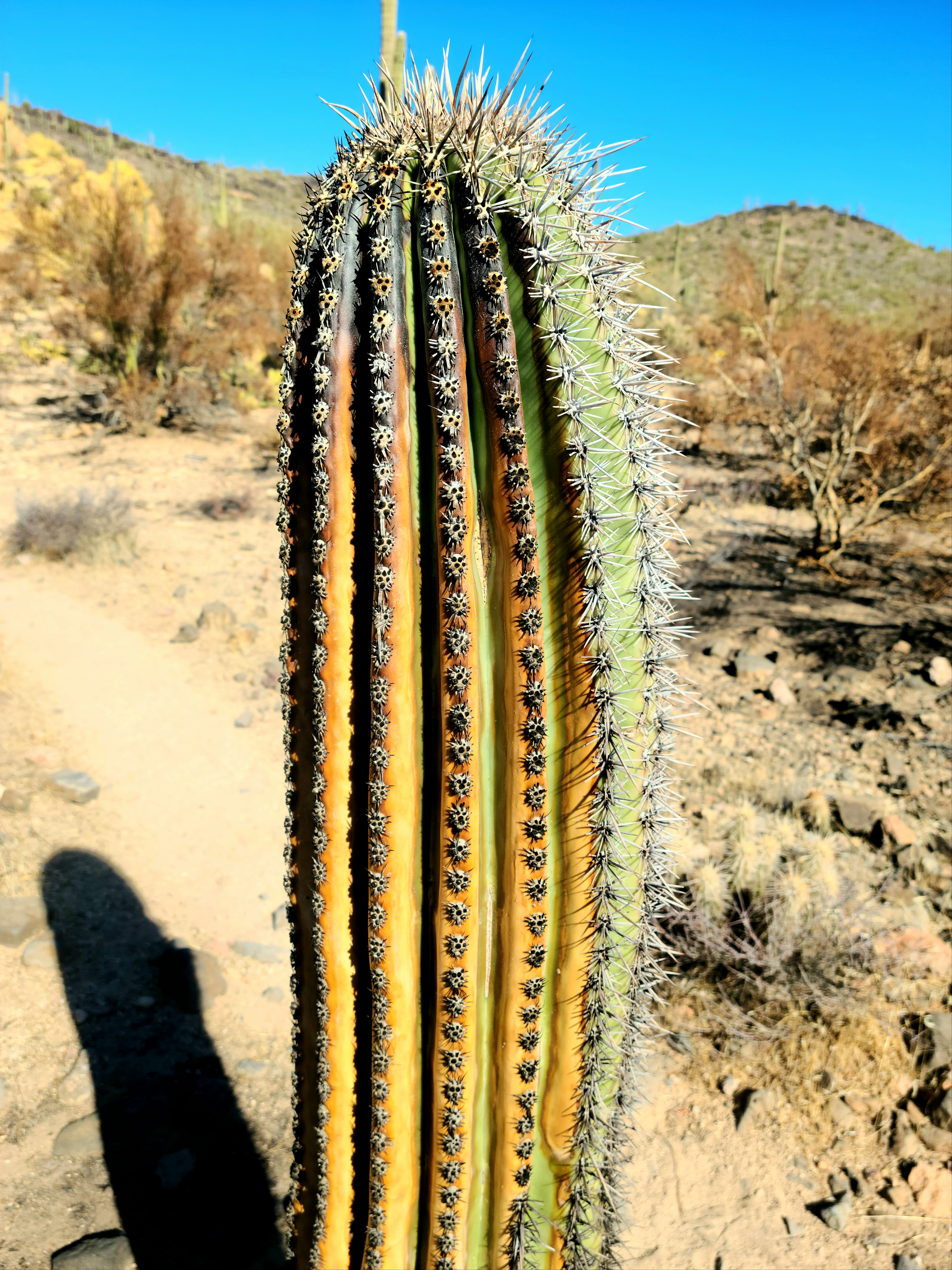
Fire-damaged saguaro cactus near Phoenix

Desert lands in and around the city have become increasingly susceptible to wildfire outbreaks. Fire risk is highest in the dry spring and summer months following wet winters, due to the resulting carpet of invasive buffelgrass, weeds, and brush. Rugged terrain often makes firefighting efforts difficult. Because many desert plants are not adapted to fire, wildfires pose a considerable threat to the future of the local desert ecosystem.

Generally speaking, the annual minimum temperature in Phoenix is in the mid-to-low 30s. It rarely drops to 32 °F (0 °C) or below, having done so in only nine of the years between 1991 and 2020 on a total of seventeen days. However, peripheral portions of the Phoenix metropolitan area frequently see frost in the winter. The earliest freeze on record occurred on November 4, 1956, and the latest occurred on March 31, 1987. (Note: Since Sky Harbor International Airport (PHX) opened, the earliest and latest freezes recorded there are November 3, 1946, and April 4, 1945, respectively. However, as the official Phoenix climatology station was changed to PHX in October 1953, those records are not considered official.) The all-time lowest recorded temperature in Phoenix was 16 °F (−9 °C) on January 7, 1913, while the coldest daily high temperature ever recorded was 36 °F (2 °C) on December 10, 1898. The longest continuous stretch without a day of frost in Phoenix was nearly eight years, from December 27, 1990, to December 23, 1998.

Snow is rare in Phoenix. Snowfall was first officially recorded in 1898, and since then, accumulations of 0.1 inches (0.25 cm) or greater have occurred only eight times within city limits. The heaviest snowstorm on record took place on January 21–22, 1937, when 1 to 4 inches (2.5 to 10.2 cm) fell in parts of the city and did not melt entirely for three days. On December 6, 1998, snow fell across the northwest portions of the city, and Sky Harbor reported a dusting of snow. On February 21–22, 2019, the far northern and northeastern sections of the metro area received several inches of snow while Sky Harbor reported record rainfall. A similar storm impacted the region on March 1, 2023. Between 2010 and 2021, Phoenix experienced three significant winter storms with accumulating, snow-like graupel.

Climate data for Phoenix Int'l, Arizona (1991–2020 normals, (Note: Mean monthly maxima and minima (i.e. the highest and lowest temperature readings during an entire month or year) calculated based on data at said location from 1991 to 2020.) extremes 1895–present) (Note: Official records for Phoenix kept at downtown August 1895 to September 1953, and at Sky Harbor Int'l since October 1953. For more information see ThreadEx.)
Month	Jan	Feb	Mar	Apr	May	Jun	Jul	Aug	Sep	Oct	Nov	Dec	Year
Record high °F (°C)	88 (31)	92 (33)	105 (41)	105 (41)	114 (46)	122 (50)	121 (49)	118 (48)	117 (47)	113 (45)	99 (37)	88 (31)	122 (50)
Mean maximum °F (°C)	78.2 (25.7)	82.1 (27.8)	90.4 (32.4)	99.0 (37.2)	105.7 (40.9)	112.7 (44.8)	114.6 (45.9)	113.2 (45.1)	108.9 (42.7)	100.7 (38.2)	88.9 (31.6)	77.7 (25.4)	115.7 (46.5)
Mean daily maximum °F (°C)	67.6 (19.8)	70.8 (21.6)	78.1 (25.6)	85.5 (29.7)	94.5 (34.7)	104.2 (40.1)	106.5 (41.4)	105.1 (40.6)	100.4 (38.0)	89.2 (31.8)	76.5 (24.7)	66.2 (19.0)	87.1 (30.6)
Daily mean °F (°C)	56.8 (13.8)	59.9 (15.5)	66.3 (19.1)	73.2 (22.9)	82.0 (27.8)	91.4 (33.0)	95.5 (35.3)	94.4 (34.7)	89.2 (31.8)	77.4 (25.2)	65.1 (18.4)	55.8 (13.2)	75.6 (24.2)
Mean daily minimum °F (°C)	46.0 (7.8)	49.0 (9.4)	54.5 (12.5)	60.8 (16.0)	69.5 (20.8)	78.6 (25.9)	84.5 (29.2)	83.6 (28.7)	78.1 (25.6)	65.6 (18.7)	53.7 (12.1)	45.3 (7.4)	64.1 (17.8)
Mean minimum °F (°C)	36.0 (2.2)	40.0 (4.4)	44.4 (6.9)	50.1 (10.1)	58.4 (14.7)	69.4 (20.8)	74.4 (23.6)	74.2 (23.4)	68.3 (20.2)	53.8 (12.1)	42.0 (5.6)	35.4 (1.9)	33.8 (1.0)
Record low °F (°C)	16 (−9)	24 (−4)	25 (−4)	35 (2)	39 (4)	49 (9)	63 (17)	58 (14)	47 (8)	34 (1)	27 (−3)	22 (−6)	16 (−9)
Average precipitation inches (mm)	0.87 (22)	0.87 (22)	0.83 (21)	0.22 (5.6)	0.13 (3.3)	0.02 (0.51)	0.91 (23)	0.93 (24)	0.57 (14)	0.56 (14)	0.57 (14)	0.74 (19)	7.22 (183)
Average precipitation days (≥ 0.01 in)	3.8	4.1	3.1	1.5	1.0	0.5	3.9	4.6	2.5	2.2	2.2	4.0	33.4
Average relative humidity (%)	50.9	44.4	39.3	27.8	21.9	19.4	31.6	36.2	35.6	36.9	43.8	51.8	36.6
Average dew point °F (°C)	32.4 (0.2)	32.2 (0.1)	32.9 (0.5)	31.6 (−0.2)	34.3 (1.3)	39.0 (3.9)	56.1 (13.4)	58.3 (14.6)	52.3 (11.3)	43.0 (6.1)	35.8 (2.1)	33.1 (0.6)	40.1 (4.5)
Mean monthly sunshine hours	256.0	257.2	318.4	353.6	401.0	407.8	378.5	360.8	328.6	308.9	256.0	244.8	3,871.6
Percentage possible sunshine	81	84	86	90	93	95	86	87	89	88	82	79	87
Average ultraviolet index	3.1	4.4	6.6	8.5	9.7	10.9	11.0	10.1	8.3	5.6	3.7	2.7	7.0
Source 1: NOAA (dew points, relative humidity, and sun 1961–1990), Weather.com
Source 2: UV Index Today (1995 to 2022)

Climate data for Phoenix
Month	Jan	Feb	Mar	Apr	May	Jun	Jul	Aug	Sep	Oct	Nov	Dec	Year
Mean daily daylight hours	10.0	11.0	12.0	13.0	14.0	14.0	14.0	13.0	12.0	11.0	10.0	10.0	12.0
Average Ultraviolet index	3	4	6	8	10	11	11	10	8	6	4	3	6.9
Source: Weather Atlas

== Time series ==
See or edit raw graph data.
