= Richardson number =

Dimensionless metric in fluid dynamics

The Richardson number, denoted Ri, is named after Lewis Fry Richardson (1881–1953). It is a dimensionless number that expresses the ratio of the buoyancy term to the flow shear term in fluid dynamics:
$$\mathrm{Ri} = \frac{\text{buoyancy}}{\text{flow shear}} = \frac{g}{\rho} \frac{\partial \rho / \partial z}{(\partial u / \partial z)^2},$$
where $g$ is the local acceleration due to gravity, $\rho$ is the mass density, $u$ is a representative flow velocity, and $z$ is depth.

The Richardson number given above is one of several variants, and is of practical importance in weather forecasting as well as the investigation of density and turbidity currents in oceans, lakes, and reservoirs.

When considering flows in which density differences are small (the Boussinesq approximation), it is commonplace to use the reduced gravity $g'$. This situation gives the densimetric Richardson number
$$\mathrm{Ri} = -\frac{\partial g'/\partial z}{(\partial u / \partial z)^2},$$
which is frequently used when examining atmospheric or oceanic flows.

If Ri ≪ 1, buoyancy can be neglected in the flow. By contrast, if Ri ≫ 1, then buoyancy dominates in the sense that there is insufficient kinetic energy to homogenize the fluid. However, if Ri ≅ 1, then the flow is likely to be buoyancy-driven; that is, the energy of the flow derives from the potential energy of the system.

== Aviation ==
In aviation, the Richardson number is used as a rough measure of expected air turbulence. A lower value indicates a higher degree of turbulence. Values in the range 10 to 0.1 are typical, with values below unity indicating significant turbulence.

== Thermal convection ==
In thermal convection, the Richardson number represents the importance of natural convection relative to forced convection:
$$\mathrm{Ri} = \frac{g \beta (T_\text{hot} - T_\text{ref}) L}{v^2},$$
where $g$ is the gravitational acceleration, $\beta$ is the thermal expansion coefficient, $T_\text{hot}$ is the hot wall temperature, $T_\text{ref}$ is the reference temperature, $L$ is the characteristic length, and $v$ is the characteristic velocity.

The Richardson number can also be expressed by using a combination of the Grashof number and the Reynolds number:
$$\mathrm{Ri} = \frac{\mathrm{Gr}}{\mathrm{Re}^2}.$$
Typically, natural convection is negligible when Ri < 0.1, forced convection is negligible when Ri > 10, and neither is negligible when 0.1 < Ri < 10. It may be noted that usually forced convection is large relative to natural convection, except in the case of extremely low forced-flow velocities. However, buoyancy often plays a significant role in defining the laminar-turbulent transition of a mixed convection flow. In the design of water-filled thermal energy storage tanks, the Richardson number can be useful.

== Meteorology ==
In atmospheric science, several different expressions of the Richardson number are commonly used: flux Ri (which is fundamental), gradient Ri, and bulk Ri.

The flux Richardson number is the ratio of buoyant production (or suppression) of turbulence kinetic energy to the production of turbulence by shear:
$$\mathrm{Ri}_\text{f} = \frac{(g / T_\text{v}) \overline{w' \theta_\text{v}'}}{\overline{u' w'} \frac{\partial \overline{u}}{\partial z} + \overline{v' w'} \frac{\partial \overline{v}}{\partial z}},$$
where $T_\text{v}$ is the virtual temperature, $\theta_\text{v}$ is the virtual potential temperature, and $z$ is the altitude. The quantities $u$, $v$, and $w$ are the $x$, $y$, and $z$ (vertical) components of the wind velocity, respectively. A primed quantity (e.g., $w'$) denotes a deviation of the respective field from its Reynolds average.

The gradient Richardson number is obtained by approximating the flux Richardson number above using K-theory. This gives:
$$\mathrm{Ri}_\text{g} = \frac{(g / T_\text{v}) \frac{\partial \theta_\text{v}}{\partial z}}{(\frac{\partial u}{\partial z})^2 + (\frac{\partial v}{\partial z})^{2}}.$$

The bulk Richardson number is the result of making a finite difference approximation to the derivatives in the expression for the gradient Richardson number above:
$$\mathrm{Ri}_\text{b} = \frac{(g / T_{\text{v}0})\Delta \theta_\text{v} \Delta z}{(\Delta u)^2 + (\Delta v)^2},$$
where, for any variable $f$, $\Delta f = f_{z1} - f_{z0}$, i.e., the difference between $f$ at altitude $z1$ and altitude $z0$. If the lower reference level is taken to be $z0 = 0$, then $u_{z0} = v_{z0} = 0$ (due to the no-slip boundary condition), giving the bulk Richardson number as:
$$\mathrm{Ri}_\text{b} = \frac{(g / \theta_{\text{v}0})(\theta_{\text{v}z1} - \theta_{\text{v}0}) z}{(u_{z1})^2 + (v_{z1})^2}.$$

== Oceanography ==
In oceanography, the Richardson number has a more general form that takes stratification into account. In this context, Ri is a measure of the relative importance of mechanical and density effects in the water column, as described by the Taylor–Goldstein equation, which is used to model Kelvin–Helmholtz instability in the case of driven sheared-flows:
$$\mathrm{Ri} = \frac{N^2}{(\partial u / \partial z)^2},$$
where $N$ is the Brunt–Väisälä frequency and $\partial u / \partial z$ is the water velocity shear.

The Richardson number given above is always considered positive. A negative value of $N^2$ (i.e., $N$ is complex) indicates unstable density gradients with active convective overturning. Under such circumstances, the magnitude of a negative Ri is not generally of interest. It can be shown that Ri < 0.25 is a necessary condition for velocity shear to overcome the tendency of a stratified fluid to remain stratified; moreover, some mixing (turbulence) will generally occur. When Ri is large, turbulent mixing across the stratification is generally suppressed.
