= Thermo-magnetic motor =

Magnet motor

Thermomagnetic motors (also known as Curie wheels, Curie-motors and pyromagnetic motors) convert heat into kinetic energy using the thermomagnetic effect, i.e., the influence of temperature on the magnetic material magnetization.

== Historical background ==
This technology dates back to 19th century, when a number of scientists submitted patents on the so-called "pyro-magnetic generators". These systems operate in a magnetic Brayton cycle, in a reverse way of the magnetocaloric refrigerators. Experiments have produced only extremely inefficient working prototypes, however, thermodynamic analysis indicate that thermomagnetic motors present high efficiency related to Carnot efficiency for small temperature differences around the magnetic material Curie temperature. The thermomagnetic motor principle has been studied as a possible actuator in smart materials, being successful in the generation of electric energy from ultra-low temperature gradients.

== See also ==
- Thermomagnetic convection
