= Gravity current intrusion =

Gravity phenomenon

The term gravity current intrusion denotes the fluid mechanics phenomenon within which a fluid intrudes with a predominantly horizontal motion into a separate stratified fluid, typically along a plane of neutral buoyancy. This behaviour distinguishes the difference between gravity current intrusions and gravity currents, as intrusions are not restrained by a well-defined boundary surface. As with gravity currents, intrusion flow is driven within a gravity field by density differences typically small enough to allow for the Boussinesq approximation.

The driving density difference between fluids that produces intrusion motion could simply be due to chemical composition. However variations can also be caused by differences in respective fluid temperatures, dissolved matter concentrations and by particulate matter suspended in flows. Examples of particulate suspension intrusions include sediment laden river outflows within oceans, 'short-circuit' sewage sedimentation tank intrusions and turbidity current flows over hypersaline Mediterranean pools. Examples also exist of particulate intrusions caused by the lateral spread of thermals or plumes along planes of neutral buoyancy; such as intrusions containing metalliferous sediments formed from deep ocean hydrothermal vents. Or equally crystal laden intrusions formed by plumes within volcanic magma chambers. Arguably the most striking of all gravitational intrusions, is the atmospheric gravity current generated from a large, 'Plinean' volcanic eruption. In which case the volcano's overhanging 'umbrella' is an example of an intrusion laterally intruding into the stratified Troposphere.

== Research ==
Work analysing gravity currents propagating within a single fluid host was broadened to consider intrusions within sharply stratified fluids by Hoyler & Huppert in 1980. Since then there have been further significant analytical and experimental advancements into understanding specifically particle laden intrusions by researchers including Bonnecaze, et al., (1993, 1995, 1996), Rimoldi et al. (1996), and Rooij, et al. (1999). As of 2012 the most recent rigorous analytical analysis, designed to determine the propagation speed of a classically extending intrusion, was performed by Flynn and Linden. Practical experimentation into intrusions has typically employed a lock exchange to study intrusion dynamics.

== Structure ==
The basic structure of a gravity intrusion is approximate to that of a classic current with a roughly elliptical 'head' followed by a tail which stretches with increased current length, it is within the rear half of the intrusion head that the majority of mixing with ambient fluids takes place. As with gravity currents, intrusions display the same 'slumping', 'self –similar' and 'viscous' phases as gravity currents during propagation.
