= Franz Grashof =

German engineer (1826–1893)

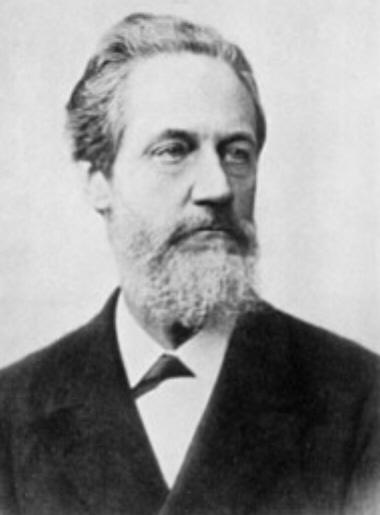
- Born: 11 July 1826; Düsseldorf, Kingdom of Prussia
- Died: 26 October 1893 (aged 67); Karlsruhe, German Empire
- Education: Königliches Technisches Institut (Nowadays Technische Universität Berlin)
- Known for: Grashof condition Grashof number
- Scientific career
- Fields: Engineering

Franz Grashof (11 July 1826 – 26 October 1893) was a German engineer. He was a professor of Applied Mechanics at the Technische Hochschule Karlsruhe.

== Biography ==
Born in Düsseldorf, Prussia, as the son of Elisabeth Brüggemann and Karl Grashof, who taught at an upper secondary school, Franz Grashof visited the elementary and lower secondary school in Düsseldorf and the industrial school in Hagen.

Motivated by the rise of steamers and the railway, he started working at a locksmith's shop. In October 1844 Franz Grashof quit school to start studying metallurgy at the royal vocational institute in Berlin, where he studied mathematics, physics and mechanical engineering. From 1847 to 1848 he interrupted his studies to voluntarily serve for the military. To serve his country he aimed at becoming a marine officer. Therefore, he had to start working as a simple sailor on a sailing ship called “Esmeralda”. Until December 1851 he sailed around the world and realized that practical work was not his main professional skill. On his journey he decided to teach at a technical school, and so he resumed his studies in Berlin in 1852. In 1854 Franz Grashof concluded his studies and became a teacher in mathematics and mechanics at the royal vocational institute in Berlin. In 1855 he got the leadership of the royal gauging office in Berlin. In the following year he was involved in the establishment of the Association of German Engineers and became its managing director until 1890.

From 1863 to 1891 he was a professor of General and Theoretical Machine Science at the Technische Hochschule Karlsruhe. He developed some early steam-flow formulas; but the naming of the Grashof number, used in natural convection heat transfer, was an honorific that did not reflect research he had done on that topic.

On October 26, 1893, he died after his second stroke.

== Honors ==
In 1884, the American Society of Mechanical Engineers elected Grashof an honorary member.

In Karlsruhe (Germany) on October 26, 1896, a memorial was inaugurated to honor his efforts. The Grashof number, an important dimensionless parameter in analyzing natural convection was named in honor of him. The Grashof condition was also named after him. It is a test used often when analysing the kinematics of four-bar linkages.

After Grashof's death, the Association of German Engineers (VDI) honored his memory by instituting the Grashof Commemorative Medal as the highest distinction that the society could bestow for merit in the engineering skills.
