= Gravity current =

Flow that is driven by a density difference and gravity

In fluid dynamics, a gravity current or density current is a primarily horizontal flow in a gravitational field that is driven by a density difference in a fluid or fluids and is constrained to flow horizontally by, for instance, a ceiling. Typically, the density difference is small enough for the Boussinesq approximation to be valid. Gravity currents can be thought of as either finite in volume, such as the pyroclastic flow from a volcano eruption, or continuously supplied from a source, such as warm air leaving the open doorway of a house in winter. Other examples include haboob dust storms, turbidity currents, avalanches, discharge from wastewater or industrial processes into rivers, or river discharge into the ocean.

Gravity currents are typically much longer than they are tall. Flows that are primarily vertical are known as plumes. As a result, it can be shown (using dimensional analysis) that vertical velocities are generally much smaller than horizontal velocities in the current; the pressure distribution is thus approximately hydrostatic, apart from near the leading edge. Gravity currents may be simulated by the shallow water equations, with special dispensation for the leading edge which behaves as a discontinuity. When a gravity current propagates along a plane of neutral buoyancy within a stratified ambient fluid, it is known as a gravity current intrusion.

== Structure and propagation ==
Although gravity currents represent the flow of fluid of one density over/under another, discussion is usually focused on the fluid that is propagating. Gravity currents can originate either from finite volume flows or from continuous flows. In the latter case, the fluid in the head is constantly replaced and the gravity current can therefore propagate, in theory, forever. Propagation of a continuous flow can be thought of as the same as that of the tail (or body) of a very long finite volume. Gravity flows are described as consisting of two parts, a head and a tail. The head, which is the leading edge of the gravity current, is a region in which relatively large volumes of ambient fluid are displaced. The tail is the bulk of flow that follows the head. Flow characteristics can be characterized by the Froude and Reynolds numbers, which represent the ratio of flow speed to gravity (buoyancy) and viscosity, respectively.

Gravity current from a lock-exchange release interacting with a submerged obstacle mounted at the bottom. Result from a 3D computational fluid dynamics (CFD) simulation. Red surface is a density iso-surface between the dense gravity-current fluid and the light ambient fluid. Before the impact, notice the billows structure and the lobe-and-cleft structure at the front.

Propagation of the head usually occurs in three phases. In the first phase, the gravity current propagation is turbulent. The flow displays billowing patterns known as Kelvin-Helmholtz instabilities, which form in the wake of the head and engulf ambient fluid into the tail: a process referred to as "entrainment". Direct mixing also occurs at the front of the head through lobes and cleft structures which form on the surface of the head. According to one paradigm, the leading edge of a gravity current 'controls' the flow behind it: it provides a boundary condition for the flow. In this phase the propagation rate of the current is approximately constant with time. For many flows of interest, the leading edge moves at a Froude number of about 1; estimates of the exact value vary between about 0.7 and 1.4. As the driving fluid depletes as a result of the current spreading into the environment, the driving head decreases until the flow becomes laminar. In this phase, there is only very little mixing and the billowing structure of the flow disappears. From this phase onward the propagation rate decreases with time and the current gradually slows down. Finally, as the current spreads even further, it becomes so thin that viscous forces between the intruding fluid and the ambient and boundaries govern the flow. In this phase no more mixing occurs and the propagation rate slows down even more.

The spread of a gravity current depends on the boundary conditions, and two cases are usually distinguished depending on whether the initial release is of the same width as the environment or not. In the case where the widths are the same, one obtains what is usually referred to as a "lock-exchange" or a "corridor" flow. This refers to the flow spreading along walls on both sides and effectively keeping a constant width whilst it propagates. In this case the flow is effectively two-dimensional. Experiments on variations of this flow have been made with lock-exchange flows propagating in narrowing/expanding environments. Effectively, a narrowing environment will result in the depth of the head increasing as the current advances and thereby its rate of propagation increasing with time, whilst in an expanding environment the opposite will occur. In the other case, the flow spreads radially from the source forming an "axisymmetric" flow. The angle of spread depends on the release conditions. In the case of a point release, an extremely rare event in nature, the spread is perfectly axisymmetric, in all other cases the current will form a sector.

When a gravity current encounters a solid boundary, it can either overcome the boundary, by flowing around or over it, or be reflected by it. The actual outcome of the collision depends primarily on the height and width of the obstacle. If the obstacle is shallow (part) of the gravity current will overcome the obstacle by flowing over it. Similarly, if the width of the obstacle is small, the gravity current will flow around it, just like a river flows around a boulder. If the obstacle cannot be overcome, provided propagation is in the turbulent phase, the gravity current will first surge vertically up (or down depending on the density contrast) along the obstacle, a process known as "sloshing". Sloshing induces a lot of mixing between the ambient and the current and this forms an accumulation of lighter fluid against the obstacle. As more and more fluid accumulates against the obstacle, this starts to propagate in the opposite direction to the initial current, effectively resulting in a second gravity current flowing on top of the original gravity current. This reflection process is a common feature of doorway flows (see below), where a gravity current flows into a finite-size space. In this case the flow repeatedly collides with the end walls of the space, causing a series of currents travelling back and forth between opposite walls. This process has been described in detail by Lane-Serff.

== Research ==
The first mathematical study of the propagation of gravity currents can be attributed to T. B. Benjamin. Observations of intrusions and collisions between fluids of differing density were made well before T. B. Benjamin's study, see for example those by Ellison and Tuner, by M. B. Abbot or D. I. H. Barr. J. E. Simpson from the Department of Applied Mathematics and Theoretical Physics of Cambridge University in the UK carried out longstanding research on gravity currents and issued a multitude of papers on the subject. He published an article in 1982 for Annual Review of Fluid Mechanics which summarizes the state of research in the domain of gravity currents at the time. Simpson also published a more detailed book on the topic.

== In nature and the built environment ==
Gravity currents are capable of transporting material across large horizontal distances. For example, turbidity currents on the seafloor may carry material thousands of kilometers. Gravity currents occur at a variety of scales throughout nature. Examples include avalanches, haboobs, seafloor turbidity currents, lahars, pyroclastic flows, and lava flows. There are also gravity currents with large density variations - the so-called low Mach number compressible flows. An example of such a gravity current is the heavy gas dispersion in the atmosphere with initial ratio of gas density to density of atmosphere between about 1.5 and 5.

Gravity currents are frequently encountered in the built environment in the form of doorway flows. These occur when a door (or window) separates two rooms of different temperature and air exchanges are allowed to occur. This can for example be experienced when sitting in a heated lobby during winter and the entrance door is suddenly opened. In this case the cold air will first be felt by ones feet as a result of the outside air propagating as a gravity current along the floor of the room. Doorway flows are of interest in the domain of natural ventilation and air conditioning/refrigeration and have been extensively investigated.

== Modelling approaches ==
=== Box models ===
For a finite volume gravity current, perhaps the simplest modelling approach is via a box model where a "box" (rectangle for 2D problems, cylinder for 3D) is used to represent the current. The box does not rotate or shear, but changes in aspect ratio (i.e. stretches out) as the flow progresses. Here, the dynamics of the problem are greatly simplified (i.e. the forces controlling the flow are not directly considered, only their effects) and typically reduce to a condition dictating the motion of the front via a Froude number and an equation stating the global conservation of mass, i.e. for a 2D problem

$$\begin{align}
\mathrm{Fr} &= \frac{u_\mathrm f}{\sqrt{ g' h }}\\
h l &= Q
\end{align}$$

where Fr is the Froude number, u_{f} is the speed at the front, g′ is the reduced gravity, h is the height of the box, l is the length of the box and Q is the volume per unit width. The model is not a good approximation in the early slumping stage of a gravity current, where h along the current is not at all constant, or the final viscous stage of a gravity current, where friction becomes important and changes Fr. The model is a good in the stage between these, where the Froude number at the front is constant and the shape of the current has a nearly constant height.

Additional equations can be specified for processes that would alter the density of the intruding fluid such as through sedimentation. The front condition (Froude number) generally cannot be determined analytically but can instead be found from experiment or observation of natural phenomena. The Froude number is not necessarily a constant, and may depend on the height of the flow in when this is comparable to the depth of overlying fluid.

The solution to this problem is found by noting that u_{f} = dl/dt and integrating for an initial length, l_{0}. In the case of a constant volume Q and Froude number Fr, this leads to

$$l^\frac32 = l_0^\frac32 + \tfrac32 \mathrm{Fr} \sqrt{g'Q}\, t \,.$$
