= Rayleigh–Bénard convection =

Type of heat transfer within fluids

Bénard cells.

In fluid thermodynamics, Rayleigh–Bénard convection is a type of natural convection, occurring in a planar horizontal layer of fluid heated from below, in which the fluid develops a regular pattern of convection cells known as Bénard cells. Such systems were first investigated by Joseph Valentin Boussinesq and Anton Oberbeck in the 19th century. This phenomenon can also manifest where a species denser than the electrolyte is consumed from below and generated at the top. Bénard–Rayleigh convection is one of the most commonly studied convection phenomena because of its analytical and experimental accessibility. The convection patterns are the most carefully examined example of self-organizing nonlinear systems. Time-dependent self-similar analytic solutions are known for the velocity fields and for the temperature distribution as well.

Buoyancy, and hence gravity, are responsible for the appearance of convection cells. The initial movement is the upwelling of less-dense fluid from the warmer bottom layer. This upwelling spontaneously organizes into a regular pattern of cells.

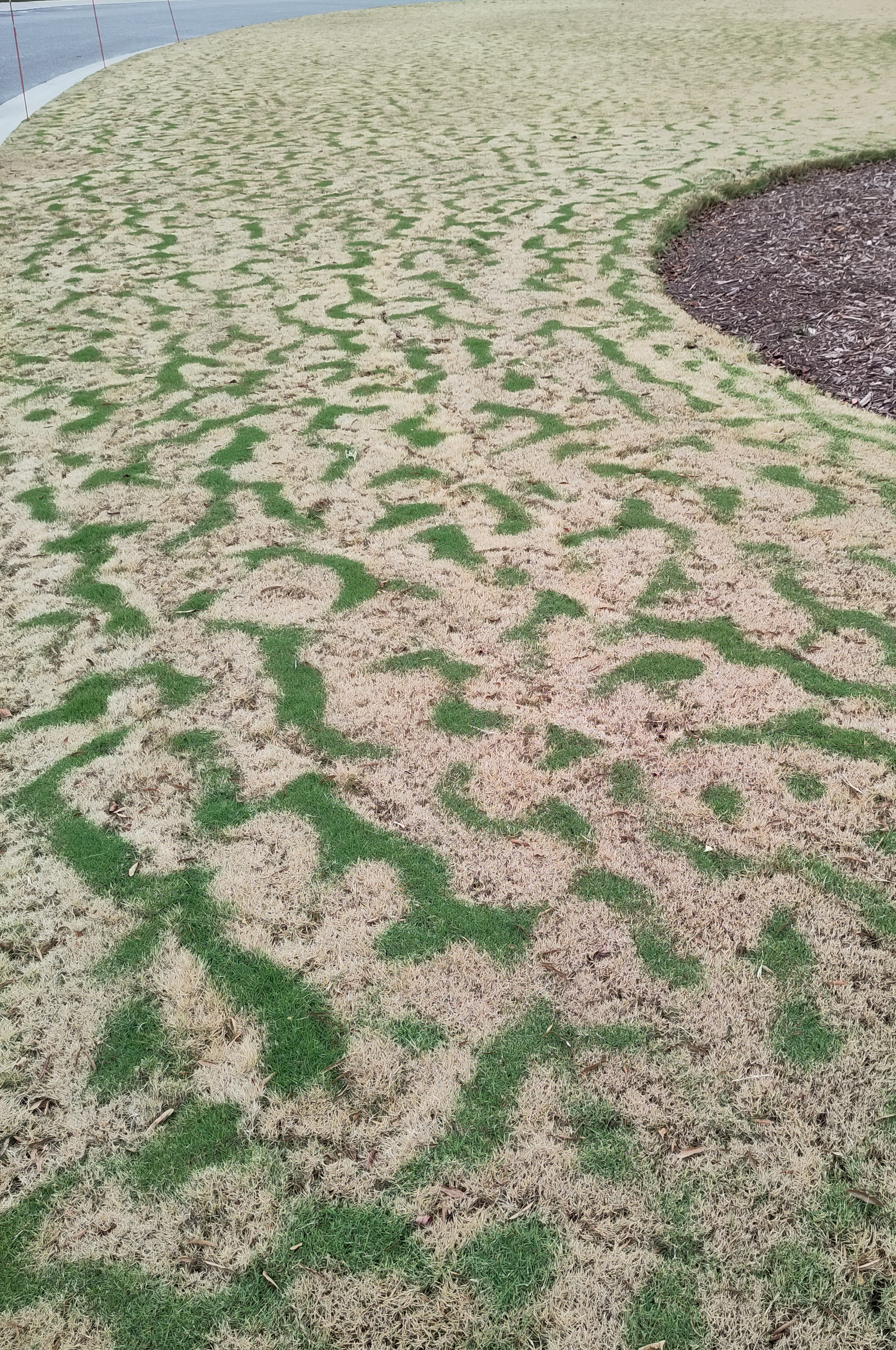
Rayleigh–Bénard convection produces complex patterns of frost damage in grass. Frost regions turn brown after several days while frost-free regions remain green. The spatial scale of the pattern is ~20cm.

== Physical processes ==
The features of Bénard convection can be obtained by a simple experiment first conducted by Henri Bénard, a French physicist, in 1900.

=== Development of convection ===
Convection cells in a gravity field

The experimental set-up uses a layer of liquid, e.g. water, between two parallel planes. The height of the layer is small compared to the horizontal dimension. At first, the temperature of the bottom plane is the same as the top plane. The liquid will then tend towards an equilibrium, where its temperature is the same as its surroundings. (Once there, the liquid is perfectly uniform: to an observer it would appear the same from any position. This equilibrium is also asymptotically stable: after a local, temporary perturbation of the outside temperature, it will go back to its uniform state, in line with the second law of thermodynamics).

Then, the temperature of the bottom plane is increased slightly, yielding a flow of thermal energy conducted through the liquid. The system will begin to have a structure of thermal conductivity: the temperature, and the density and pressure with it, will vary linearly between the bottom and top plane. A uniform linear gradient of temperature will be established. (This system may be modelled by statistical mechanics).

Once conduction is established, the microscopic random movement spontaneously becomes ordered on a macroscopic level, forming Benard convection cells, with a characteristic correlation length.

=== Convection features ===
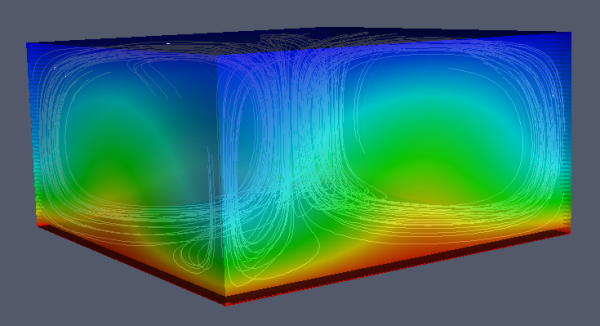
Simulation of Rayleigh–Bénard convection in 3D.

The rotation of the cells is stable and will alternate from clock-wise to counter-clockwise horizontally; this is an example of spontaneous symmetry breaking. Bénard cells are metastable. This means that a small perturbation will not be able to change the rotation of the cells, but a larger one could affect the rotation; they exhibit a form of hysteresis.

Moreover, the deterministic law at the microscopic level produces a non-deterministic arrangement of the cells: if the experiment is repeated, a particular position in the experiment will be in a clockwise cell in some cases, and a counter-clockwise cell in others. Microscopic perturbations of the initial conditions are enough to produce an essentially non-deterministic macroscopic effect. That is, in practice, there is no way to calculate the macroscopic effect of a microscopic perturbation. This inability to predict long-range conditions and sensitivity to initial conditions are characteristics of chaotic or complex systems (i.e., the butterfly effect).

Turbulent Rayleigh–Bénard convection

If the temperature of the bottom plane were to be further increased, the structure would become more complex in space and time; the turbulent flow would become chaotic.

Convective Bénard cells tend to approximate regular right hexagonal prisms, particularly in the absence of turbulence, although certain experimental conditions can result in the formation of regular right square prisms or spirals.

The convective Bénard cells are not unique and will usually appear only in the surface tension driven convection. In general the solutions to the Rayleigh and Pearson analysis (linear theory) assuming an infinite horizontal layer gives rise to degeneracy meaning that many patterns may be obtained by the system. Assuming uniform temperature at the top and bottom plates, when a realistic system is used (a layer with horizontal boundaries) the shape of the boundaries will mandate the pattern. More often than not the convection will appear as rolls or a superposition of them.

== Rayleigh–Bénard instability ==
Since there is a density gradient between the top and the bottom plate, gravity acts trying to pull the cooler, denser liquid from the top to the bottom. This gravitational force is opposed by the viscous damping force in the fluid. The balance of these two forces is expressed by a non-dimensional parameter called the Rayleigh number. The Rayleigh number is defined as:

$$\mathrm{Ra}_{L} = \frac{g \beta} {\nu \alpha} (T_b - T_u) L^3$$

where

T_{u} is the temperature of the top plate
T_{b} is the temperature of the bottom plate
L is the height of the container
g is the acceleration due to gravity
ν is the kinematic viscosity
α is the thermal diffusivity
β is the thermal expansion coefficient.

As the Rayleigh number increases, the gravitational forces become more dominant. At a critical Rayleigh number of 1708, instability sets in and convection cells appear.

The critical Rayleigh number can be obtained analytically for a number of different boundary conditions by doing a perturbation analysis on the linearized equations in the stable state. The simplest case is that of two free boundaries, which Lord Rayleigh solved in 1916, obtaining Ra = 27/4 π^{4} ≈ 657.51. In the case of a rigid boundary at the bottom and a free boundary at the top (as in the case of a kettle without a lid), the critical Rayleigh number comes out as Ra = 1,100.65.

== Effects of surface tension ==
In case of a free liquid surface in contact with air, buoyancy and surface tension effects will also play a role in how the convection patterns develop. Liquids flow from places of lower surface tension to places of higher surface tension. This is called the Marangoni effect. When applying heat from below, the temperature at the top layer will show temperature fluctuations. With increasing temperature, surface tension decreases. Thus a lateral flow of liquid at the surface will take place, from warmer areas to cooler areas. In order to preserve a horizontal (or nearly horizontal) liquid surface, cooler surface liquid will descend. This down-welling of cooler liquid contributes to the driving force of the convection cells. The specific case of temperature gradient-driven surface tension variations is known as thermo-capillary convection, or Bénard–Marangoni convection.

== History and nomenclature ==
In 1870, the Irish-Scottish physicist and engineer James Thomson (1822–1892), elder brother of Lord Kelvin, observed water cooling in a tub; he noted that the soapy film on the water's surface was divided as if the surface had been tiled (tesselated). In 1882, he showed that the tesselation was due to the presence of convection cells. In 1900, the French physicist Henri Bénard independently arrived at the same conclusion. This pattern of convection, whose effects are due solely to a temperature gradient, was first successfully analyzed in 1916 by Lord Rayleigh. Rayleigh assumed boundary conditions in which the vertical velocity component and temperature disturbance vanish at the top and bottom boundaries (perfect thermal conduction). Those assumptions resulted in the analysis losing any connection with Henri Bénard's experiment. This resulted in discrepancies between theoretical and experimental results until 1958, when John Pearson (1930– ) reworked the problem based on surface tension. This is what was originally observed by Bénard. Nonetheless in modern usage "Rayleigh–Bénard convection" refers to the effects due to temperature, whereas "Bénard–Marangoni convection" refers specifically to the effects of surface tension. Davis and Koschmieder have suggested that the convection should be rightfully called the "Pearson–Bénard convection".

Rayleigh–Bénard convection is also sometimes known as "Bénard–Rayleigh convection", "Bénard convection", or "Rayleigh convection".

== See also ==
- Hydrodynamic stability
- Marangoni effect
- Natural convection
- Giant's Causeway and Causeway Coast
- Rayleigh–Taylor instability
