= Forced convection =

Where fluid motion is generated by an external source

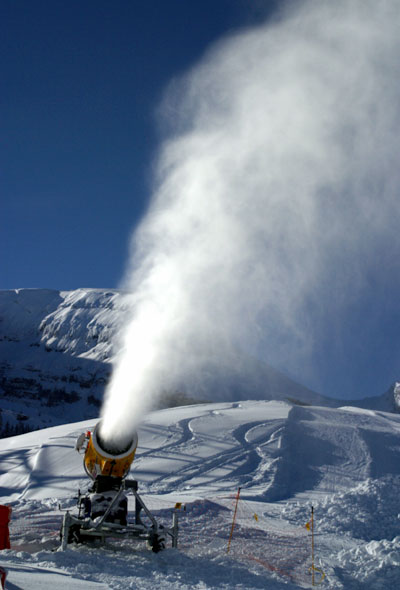
Forced convection by a fan in a snow machine

Forced convection is a mechanism, or type of transport, in which fluid motion is generated by an external source (like a pump, fan, suction device, etc.). Alongside natural convection, thermal radiation, and thermal conduction it is one of the methods of heat transfer and allows significant amounts of heat energy to be transported very efficiently.

== Applications ==
This mechanism is found very commonly in everyday life, including central heating and air conditioning and in many other machines. Forced convection is often encountered by engineers designing or analyzing heat exchangers, pipe flow, and flow over a plate at a different temperature than the stream (the case of a shuttle wing during re-entry, for example).

== Mixed convection ==
In any forced convection situation, some amount of natural convection is always present whenever there are gravitational forces present (i.e., unless the system is in an inertial frame or free-fall). When the natural convection is not negligible, such flows are typically referred to as mixed convection.

== Mathematical analysis ==
When analyzing potentially mixed convection, a parameter called the Archimedes number (Ar) parametrizes the relative strength of free and forced convection. The Archimedes number is the ratio of Grashof number and the square of Reynolds number, which represents the ratio of buoyancy force and inertia force, and which stands in for the contribution of natural convection. When Ar ≫ 1, natural convection dominates and when Ar ≪ 1, forced convection dominates.

$Ar= \frac{Gr}{Re^2}$

When natural convection isn't a significant factor, mathematical analysis with forced convection theories typically yields accurate results. The parameter of importance in forced convection is the Péclet number, which is the ratio of advection (movement by currents) and diffusion (movement from high to low concentrations) of heat.

$$Pe=\frac{U L}{\alpha }$$

When the Peclet number is much greater than unity (1), advection dominates diffusion. Similarly, much smaller ratios indicate a higher rate of diffusion relative to advection.

== See also ==
- Convective heat transfer
- Combined forced and natural convection
