= Combined forced and natural convection =

Type of heat transfer within a fluid

In fluid thermodynamics, combined forced convection and natural convection, or mixed convection, occurs when natural convection and forced convection mechanisms act together to transfer heat. This is also defined as situations where both pressure forces and buoyant forces interact. How much each form of convection contributes to the heat transfer is largely determined by the flow, temperature, geometry, and orientation. The nature of the fluid is also influential, since the Grashof number increases in a fluid as temperature increases, but is maximized at some point for a gas.

== Characterization ==
Mixed convection problems are characterized by the Grashof number (for the natural convection) and the Reynolds number (for the forced convection). The relative effect of buoyancy on mixed convection can be expressed through the Richardson number:

$$\mathrm{Ri}=\frac{\mathrm{Gr}}{\mathrm{Re}^2}$$

The respective length scales for each dimensionless number must be chosen depending on the problem, e.g. a vertical length for the Grashof number and a horizontal scale for the Reynolds number. Small Richardson numbers characterize a flow dominated by forced convection. Richardson numbers higher than $\mathrm{Ri}\approx 16$ indicate that the flow problem is pure natural convection and the influence of forced convection can be neglected.

Like for natural convection, the nature of a mixed convection flow is highly dependent on heat transfer (as buoyancy is one of the driving mechanisms) and turbulence effects play a significant role.

== Cases ==
Because of the wide range of variables, hundreds of papers have been published for experiments involving various types of fluids and geometries. This variety makes a comprehensive correlation difficult to obtain, and when it is, it is usually for very limited cases. Combined forced and natural convection, however, can be generally described in one of three ways.

=== Two-dimensional mixed convection with aiding flow ===
The first case is when natural convection aids forced convection. This is seen when the buoyant motion is in the same direction as the forced motion, thus accelerating the boundary layer and enhancing the heat transfer. Transition to turbulence, however, can be delayed. An example of this would be a fan blowing upward on a hot plate. Since heat naturally rises, the air being forced upward over the plate adds to the heat transfer.

=== Two-dimensional mixed convection with opposing flow ===
The second case is when natural convection acts in the opposite way of the forced convection. Consider a fan forcing air upward over a cold plate. In this case, the buoyant force of the cold air naturally causes it to fall, but the air being forced upward opposes this natural motion. Depending on the Richardson number, the boundary layer at the cold plate exhibits a lower velocity than the free stream, or even accelerates in the opposite direction. This second mixed convection case therefore experiences strong shear in the boundary layer and quickly transitions into a turbulent flow state.

=== Three-dimensional mixed convection ===
The third case is referred to as three-dimensional mixed convection. This flow occurs when the buoyant motion acts perpendicular to the forced motion. An example of this case is a hot, vertical flate plate with a horizontal flow, e.g. the surface of a solar thermal central receiver. While the free stream continues its motion along the imposed direction, the boundary layer at the plate accelerates in the upward direction. In this flow case, buoyancy plays a major role in the laminar-turbulent transition, while the imposed velocity can suppress turbulence (laminarization)

== Calculation of total heat transfer ==
Simply adding or subtracting the heat transfer coefficients for forced and natural convection will yield inaccurate results for mixed convection. Also, as the influence of buoyancy on the heat transfer sometimes even exceeds the influence of the free stream, mixed convection should not be treated as pure forced convection. Consequently, problem-specific correlations are required. Experimental data has suggested that

$$\mathrm{Nu}=(\mathrm{Nu}_\mathrm{forced}^n + \mathrm{Nu}_\mathrm{natural}^n)^{1/n}$$

can describe the area-averaged heat transfer. For the case of a large, vertical surface in a horizontal flow $n=3.2$ provided a best fit depending on the details of how $\mathrm{Nu}_\mathrm{forced}$ is fitted.

== Applications ==
Combined forced and natural convection is often seen in very-high-power-output devices where the forced convection is not enough to dissipate all of the heat necessary. At this point, combining natural convection with forced convection will often deliver the desired results. Examples of these processes are nuclear reactor technology and some aspects of electronic cooling.
