= Thermomagnetic convection =

Ferrofluids can be used to transfer heat, since heat and mass transport in such magnetic fluids can be controlled using an external magnetic field.

B. A. Finlayson first explained in 1970 (in his paper "Convective instability of ferromagnetic fluids", Journal of Fluid Mechanics, 40:753-767) how an external magnetic field imposed on a ferrofluid with varying magnetic susceptibility, e.g., due to a temperature gradient, results in a nonuniform magnetic body force, which leads to thermomagnetic convection. This form of heat transfer can be useful for cases where conventional convection fails to provide adequate heat transfer, e.g., in miniature microscale devices or under reduced gravity conditions.

Ozoe group has studied thermomagnetic convection both experimentally and numerically. They showed how to enhance, suppress, and invert the convection modes. They have also carried out scaling analysis for paramagnetic fluids in microgravity conditions.

A comprehensive review of thermomagnetic convection (in A. Mukhopadhyay, R. Ganguly, S. Sen, and I. K. Puri, "Scaling analysis to characterize thermomagnetic convection", International Journal of Heat and Mass Transfer 48:3485-3492, (2005)) also shows that this form of convection can be correlated with a dimensionless magnetic Rayleigh number. Subsequently, this group explained that fluid motion occurs due to a Kelvin body force with two terms. The first term can be treated as a magnetostatic pressure. In contrast, the second is important only if there is a spatial gradient of the fluid susceptibility, e.g., in a non-isothermal system. The colder fluid that has a larger magnetic susceptibility is attracted towards regions with larger field strength during thermomagnetic convection, which displaces warmer fluid of lower susceptibility. They showed that thermomagnetic convection can be correlated with a dimensionless magnetic Rayleigh number. Heat transfer due to this form of convection can be much more effective than buoyancy-induced convection for systems with small dimensions.

The ferrofluid magnetization depends on the local value of the applied magnetic field H and on the fluid magnetic susceptibility. In a ferrofluid flow encompassing varying temperatures, the susceptibility is a function of the temperature. This produces a force that can be expressed in the Navier–Stokes or momentum equation governing fluid flow as the "Kelvin body force (KBF)". Recently, Kumar et.al shed new light on the 20-plus year-old question of the appropriate tensor form of the Kelvin body force in Ferrofluids.

The KBF creates a static pressure field that is symmetric about a magnet, e.g., a line dipole, that produces a curl-free force field, i.e., curl(ℑ) = 0 for constant temperature flow. Such a symmetric field does not alter the velocity. However, if the temperature distribution about the imposed magnetic field is asymmetric, so is the KBF in which case curl(ℑ) ≠ 0. Such an asymmetric body force leads to ferrofluid motion across isotherms.
