= Haboob =

Type of intense dust storm

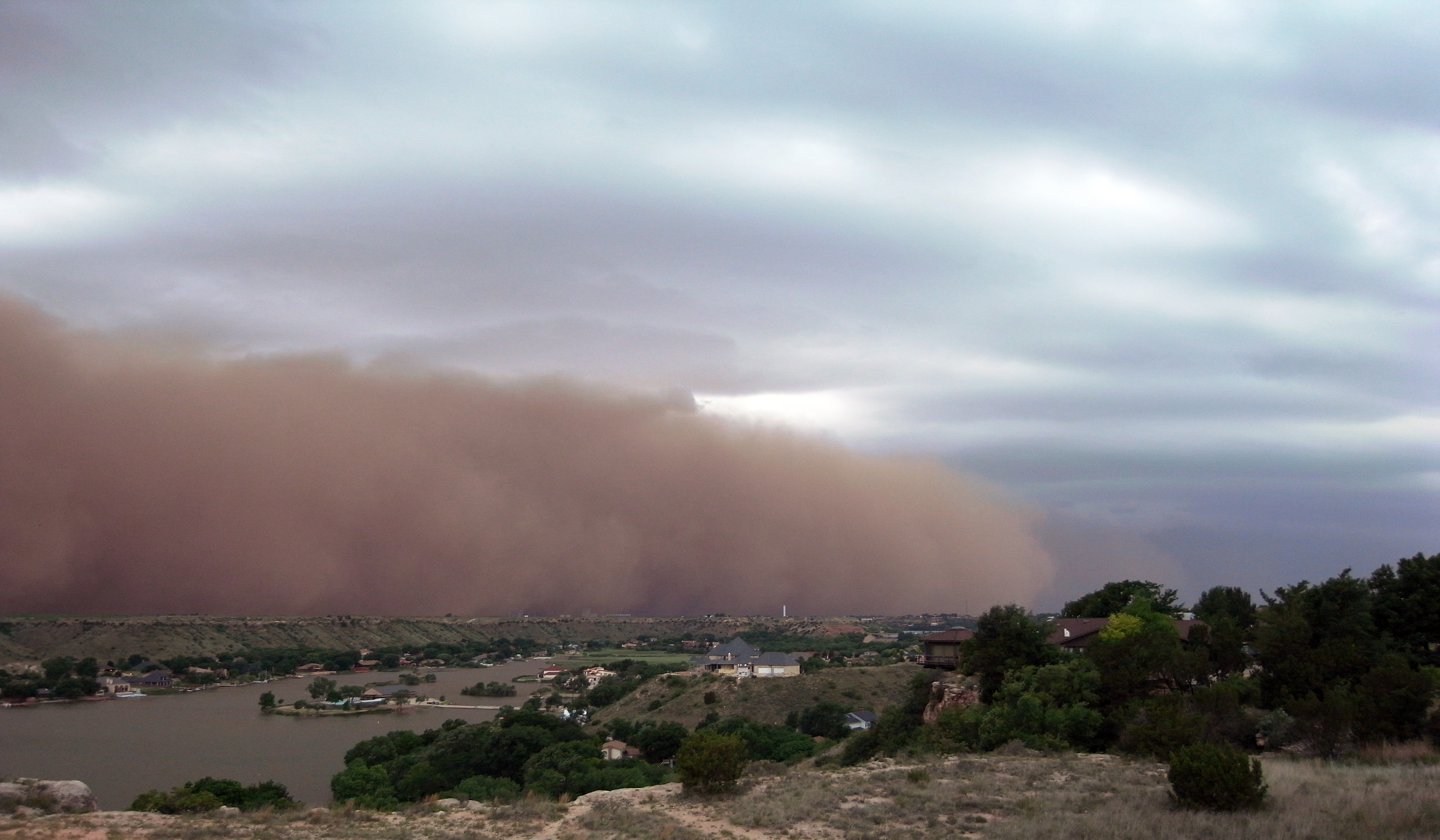
A haboob moves across the Llano Estacado toward Yellow House Canyon, near the residential community of Ransom Canyon, Texas (2009)

A haboob (Arabic: هَبوب, romanized: habūb, lit. 'blasting/drifting') is an atmospheric density current forming an intense dust storm generated by strong winds from the downdrafts of thunderstorms or, less commonly, weather fronts. These storms occur in arid and semi-arid regions worldwide, including West Asia, North Africa, Australia, and North America, and have also been observed on Mars and Titan. A haboob typically forms when cold air from a thunderstorm rushes downward, causing high winds at the surface which lift dust into the air.

In Khartoum, Sudan, haboobs have been historically documented as reaching up to 2,000 m (7,000 ft) high, advancing at up to 70 km/h (45 mph), and lasting as long as 6 1/2 hours. Haboobs can occasionally span distances as long as 1,000 km (600 mi).

== Etymology ==
The term "haboob" comes from the Arabic root "haab" meaning wind or blow. The term was originally used to describe dust storms in Sudan, and was first applied to North American dust storms in 1972 by Robert Ingram and co-authors. The term came into common English usage in Arizona after 1999.

== Formation and characteristics ==
When thunderstorms form, winds move in a direction opposite to the storm's travel, and they move from all directions into the thunderstorm. When the storm collapses and begins to release precipitation, wind directions reverse, gusting outward from the storm and generally gusting the strongest in the direction of the storm's travel.

When this downdraft of cold, denser air, or downburst, reaches the ground, it sweeps up dry, loose silt and clay (referred to collectively as dust) from the desert, forming a wall of airborne sediment that precedes the storm cloud. This wall of dust can be up to 100 km (62 mi) wide, and several kilometers high. During their peak intensity, haboob winds can reach speeds of 35–100 km/h (22–62 mph) and may approach suddenly with minimal warning. Rain often fails to reach the ground level as it evaporates in the hot, dry air (a phenomenon known as virga). The evaporation process further chills the rushing air and propels it forward. In some instances, persistent rain may carry a significant amount of dust, leading to what is termed as mud storms in severe cases.

== Safety ==
Eye and respiratory system protection is advisable for anyone who must be outside during a haboob. Moving to shelter is highly advised during a strong event.

While operating a vehicle, drivers are advised to pull over to the side of the road and turn off their lights to avoid confusing other drivers in conditions of poor visibility.

== Occurrence ==
=== West Asia ===
Haboobs have been observed across the Arabian Peninsula, throughout Kuwait, and in the most arid regions of Iraq. Haboob winds in the Arabian Peninsula, Iraq, and Kuwait are frequently created by the collapse of a thunderstorm.

=== North Africa ===
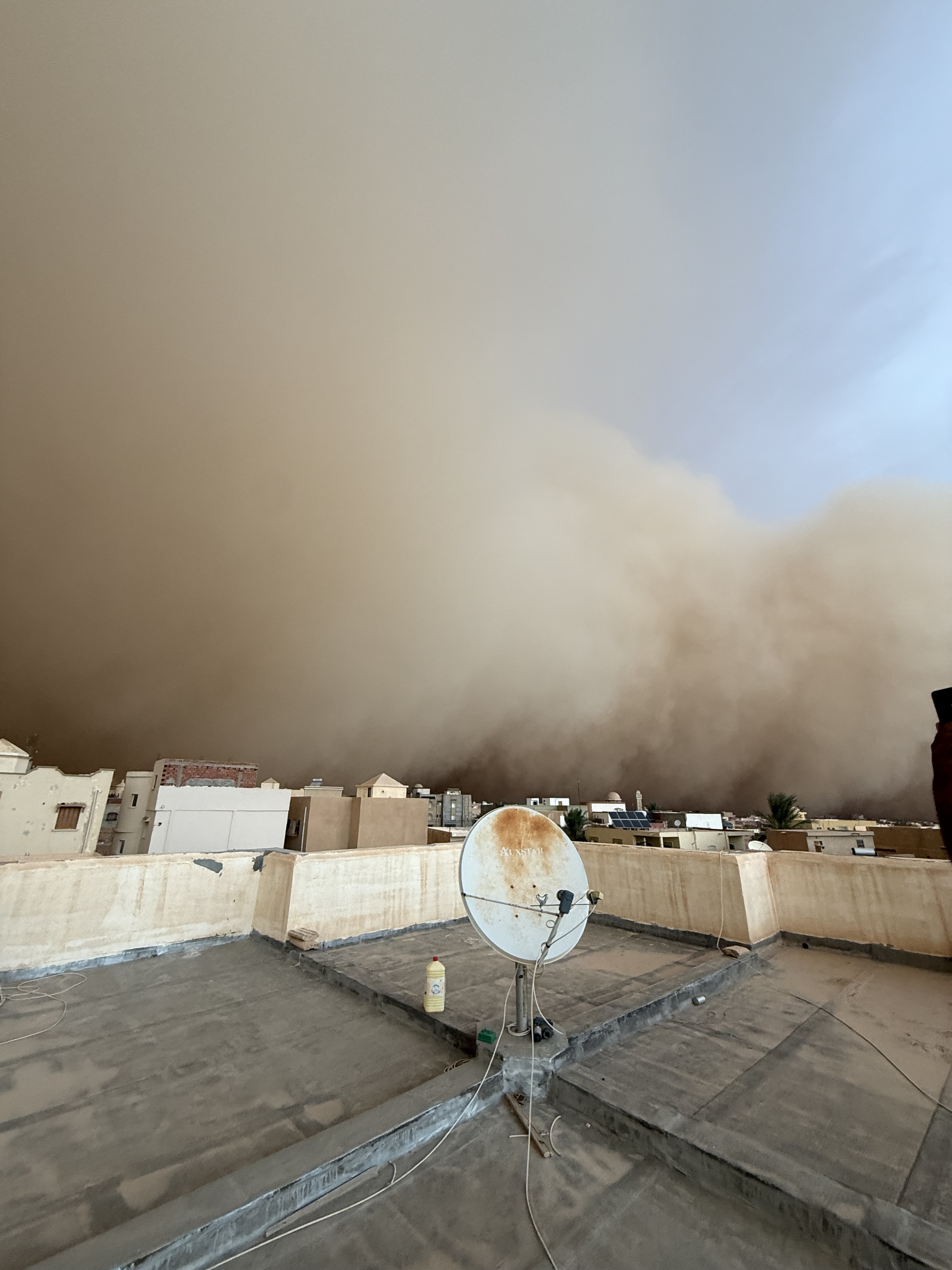
Haboob dust storm in Tozeur, southern Tunisia.

African haboobs often occur in the Sahara and Sahel biogeographical regions, and most typically in Sudan, where they were named and described. They result from the northward summer shift of the Intertropical Convergence Zone into North Africa, bringing moisture from the Gulf of Guinea.

=== Australia ===
Haboobs in Australia may be frequently associated with cold fronts. The deserts of Central Australia, especially near Alice Springs, are particularly prone to haboobs, with sand and debris reaching several kilometers into the sky and leaving up to 30 centimetres (1 ft) of sand in the haboob's path.

=== North America ===
As in West Asia, haboobs in North America are often created by the collapse of a thunderstorm. This is a local or mesoscale event, and at times of extreme drought they can originate in agricultural regions. Some of the most famous dust storms of the Dust Bowl and similar conditions later were in fact synoptic scale events typically generated by a strong cold frontal passage, with storms on 11 November 1911, 9–11 May 1934, 14 April 1935, and 19 February 1954 having been particularly vivid examples.

The arid and semiarid regions of North America—in fact, any dry region—may experience haboobs. In North America, these events are commonly also referred to as either dust storm or sandstorm. In the U.S., they frequently occur in the deserts of Arizona, including around the cities of Yuma, Tucson and Phoenix; in New Mexico, including Albuquerque; eastern California; west Texas; and the High Plains. Per the Washington State Department of Ecology, they also occur in the Columbia Basin of Eastern Washington, and can impact cities such as Walla Walla and Spokane. In Washington, improved farming practices have led to a decline in large dust storms and haboobs since the 1990s, with the largest likelihood of formation between late March through April, corresponding to the beginning of field tilling in Eastern Washington. In Mexico, they occur in the northern part of the country in the Sonoran and Chihuahuan Desert. Most recently, a haboob impacted the cities of Guaymas, San Carlos, and Empalme, Sonora on 20 July 2023.

Usage of the Arabic term by local news media in some parts of the U.S. has sometimes attracted criticism by viewers and readers.

=== Mars ===
Global dust storms on Mars have been compared to haboobs on Earth.

=== Titan ===
Dust storms of Titan observed in 2009 and 2010 have been compared to haboobs. However, the convective storm clouds are composed of liquid methane droplets, and the dust is likely composed of organic tholins.

== See also ==
- Bora (wind)
- Density current
- Dry thunderstorm
- Dust devil
- Intertropical Convergence Zone
- Khamsin
- Mistral (wind)
- Outflow boundary
- Simoom
- Sirocco
