= Grashof number =

Dimensionless quantity; ratio of a fluid's buoyancy to viscosity

In fluid mechanics (especially fluid thermodynamics), the Grashof number (Gr, after Franz Grashof (Note: Although this term "Grashof Number" had already been in use, it wasn't named until around 1921, 28 years after Franz Grashof's death. It is unclear why the grouping was named after him.)) is a dimensionless number which approximates the ratio of the buoyancy to viscous forces acting on a fluid. It frequently arises in the study of situations involving natural convection and is analogous to the Reynolds number (Re).

== Definition ==
=== Heat transfer ===
Free convection is caused by a change in density of a fluid due to a temperature change or gradient. Usually the density decreases due to an increase in temperature and causes the fluid to rise. This motion is caused by the buoyancy force. The major force that resists the motion is the viscous force. The Grashof number is a way to quantify the opposing forces.

The Grashof number is:

$\mathrm{Gr}_L = \frac{g \beta (T_s - T_\infty ) L^3}{\nu ^2}\,$ for vertical flat plates
$\mathrm{Gr}_D = \frac{g \beta (T_s - T_\infty ) D^3}{\nu ^2}\,$ for pipes and bluff bodies

where:

- g is gravitational acceleration due to Earth
- β is the coefficient of volume expansion (equal to approximately 1/T for ideal gases)
- T_{s} is the surface temperature
- T_{∞} is the bulk temperature
- L is the vertical length
- D is the diameter
- ν is the kinematic viscosity.

The L and D subscripts indicate the length scale basis for the Grashof number.

The transition to turbulent flow occurs in the range 10^{8} < Gr_{L} < 10^{9} for natural convection from vertical flat plates. At higher Grashof numbers, the boundary layer is turbulent; at lower Grashof numbers, the boundary layer is laminar, that is, in the range 10^{3} < Gr_{L} < 10^{6}.

=== Mass transfer ===
There is an analogous form of the Grashof number used in cases of natural convection mass transfer problems. In the case of mass transfer, natural convection is caused by concentration gradients rather than temperature gradients.

$\mathrm{Gr}_c = \frac{g \beta^* (C_{a,s} - C_{a,a} ) L^3}{\nu^2}$

where

$\beta^* = -\frac{1}{\rho} \left ( \frac{\partial \rho}{\partial C_a} \right )_{T,p}$

and:

- g is gravitational acceleration due to Earth
- C_{a,s} is the concentration of species a at surface
- C_{a,a} is the concentration of species a in ambient medium
- L is the characteristic length
- ν is the kinematic viscosity
- ρ is the fluid density
- C_{a} is the concentration of species a
- T is the temperature (constant)
- p is the pressure (constant).

== Relationship to other dimensionless numbers ==
The Rayleigh number, shown below, is a dimensionless number that characterizes convection problems in heat transfer. A critical value exists for the Rayleigh number, above which fluid motion occurs.

$\mathrm{Ra}_{x} = \mathrm{Gr}_{x}\mathrm{Pr}$

The ratio of the Grashof number to the square of the Reynolds number may be used to determine if forced or free convection may be neglected for a system, or if there's a combination of the two. This characteristic ratio is known as the Richardson number (Ri). If the ratio is much less than one, then free convection may be ignored. If the ratio is much greater than one, forced convection may be ignored. Otherwise, the regime is combined forced and free convection.

$$\mathrm{Ri} = \frac{\mathrm{Gr}}{\mathrm{Re}^2} \gg 1  \implies \text{ignore forced convection}$$

$$\mathrm{Ri} = \frac{\mathrm{Gr}}{\mathrm{Re}^2} \approx 1 \implies \text{combined forced and free convection}$$

$$\mathrm{Ri} =  \frac{\mathrm{Gr}}{\mathrm{Re}^2} \ll 1 \implies \text{ignore free convection}$$

== Derivation ==
The first step to deriving the Grashof number is manipulating the volume expansion coefficient, $\mathrm{\beta}$ as follows.

$\beta = \frac{1}{v}\left(\frac{\partial v}{\partial T}\right)_p =\frac{-1}{\rho}\left(\frac{\partial\rho}{\partial T}\right)_p$

The $v$ in the equation above, which represents specific volume, is not the same as the $v$ in the subsequent sections of this derivation, which will represent a velocity. This partial relation of the volume expansion coefficient, $\mathrm{\beta}$, with respect to fluid density, $\mathrm{\rho}$, given constant pressure, can be rewritten as

$\rho=\rho_0 (1-\beta \Delta T)$

where:

- $\rho_0$ is the bulk fluid density
- $\rho$ is the boundary layer density
- $\Delta T = (T - T_0)$, the temperature difference between boundary layer and bulk fluid.

There are two different ways to find the Grashof number from this point. One involves the energy equation while the other incorporates the buoyant force due to the difference in density between the boundary layer and bulk fluid.

=== Energy equation ===
This discussion involving the energy equation is with respect to rotationally symmetric flow. This analysis will take into consideration the effect of gravitational acceleration on flow and heat transfer. The mathematical equations to follow apply both to rotational symmetric flow as well as two-dimensional planar flow.

$\frac{\partial}{\partial s}(\rho u r_0^{n})+{\frac{\partial}{\partial y}}(\rho v r_0^{n})=0$

where:

- $s$ is the rotational direction, i.e. direction parallel to the surface
- $u$ is the tangential velocity, i.e. velocity parallel to the surface
- $y$ is the planar direction, i.e. direction normal to the surface
- $v$ is the normal velocity, i.e. velocity normal to the surface
- $r_0$ is the radius.

In this equation the superscript n is to differentiate between rotationally symmetric flow from planar flow. The following characteristics of this equation hold true.

- $n$ = 1: rotationally symmetric flow
- $n$ = 0: planar, two-dimensional flow
- $g$ is gravitational acceleration

This equation expands to the following with the addition of physical fluid properties:

$\rho\left(u \frac{\partial u}{\partial s} + v \frac{\partial u}{\partial y}\right) = \frac{\partial}{\partial y}\left(\mu \frac{\partial u}{\partial y}\right) - \frac{d p}{d s} + \rho g.$

From here we can further simplify the momentum equation by setting the bulk fluid velocity to 0 ($u = 0$).

$\frac{d p}{d s}=\rho_0 g$

This relation shows that the pressure gradient is simply a product of the bulk fluid density and the gravitational acceleration. The next step is to plug in the pressure gradient into the momentum equation.

$\left(u \frac{\partial u}{\partial s}+v \frac{\partial u}{\partial y}\right)=\nu \left(\frac{\partial^2 u}{\partial y^2}\right)+g\frac{\rho-\rho_0}{\rho}=\nu \left(\frac{\partial^2 u}{\partial y^2}\right)-\frac{\rho_0}{\rho} g \beta (T-T_0)$

where the volume expansion coefficient to density relationship $\rho-\rho_0 = - \rho_0 \beta (T - T_0)$ found above and the kinematic viscosity relationship $\nu = \frac{\mu}{\rho}$ were substituted into the momentum equation.$u\left(\frac{\partial u}{\partial s}\right)+v \left(\frac{\partial v}{\partial y}\right)=\nu \left(\frac{\partial^2 u}{\partial y^2}\right)-\frac{\rho_0}{\rho}g \beta(T - T_0)$

To find the Grashof number from this point, the preceding equation must be non-dimensionalized. This means that every variable in the equation should have no dimension and should instead be a ratio characteristic to the geometry and setup of the problem. This is done by dividing each variable by corresponding constant quantities. Lengths are divided by a characteristic length, $L_c$. Velocities are divided by appropriate reference velocities, $V$, which, considering the Reynolds number, gives $V=\frac{\mathrm{Re}_L \nu}{L_c}$. Temperatures are divided by the appropriate temperature difference, $(T_s - T_0)$. These dimensionless parameters look like the following:

- $s^*=\frac{s}{L_c}$,
- $y^* =\frac{y}{L_c}$,
- $u^*=\frac{u}{V}$,
- $v^* = \frac{v}{V}$, and
- $T^*=\frac{(T-T_0)}{(T_s - T_0)}$.

The asterisks represent dimensionless parameter. Combining these dimensionless equations with the momentum equations gives the following simplified equation.

$$u^* \frac{\partial u^*}{\partial s^*} + v^* \frac{\partial u^*}{\partial y^*} =-\left[ \frac{\rho_0 g \beta(T_s - T_0)L_c^{3}}{\rho\nu^2 \mathrm{Re}_L^{2}} \right] T^*+\frac{1}{\mathrm{Re}_L} \frac{\partial^2 u^*}{\partial {y^*}^2}$$

$$=-\left(\frac{\rho_0}{\rho}\right)\left[\frac{g \beta(T_s - T_0)L_c^{3}}{\nu^2} \right] \frac{T^*}{\mathrm{Re}_L^{2}}+\frac{1}{\mathrm{Re}_L} \frac{\partial^2 u^*}{\partial {y^*}^2}$$

where:

$T_s$ is the surface temperature
$T_0$ is the bulk fluid temperature
$L_c$ is the characteristic length.

The dimensionless parameter enclosed in the brackets in the preceding equation is known as the Grashof number:

$$\mathrm{Gr}=\frac{g \beta(T_s-T_0)L_c^{3}}{\nu^2}.$$

=== Buckingham π theorem ===
Another form of dimensional analysis that will result in the Grashof number is known as the Buckingham π theorem. This method takes into account the buoyancy force per unit volume, $F_b$ due to the density difference in the boundary layer and the bulk fluid.

$F_b = (\rho - \rho_0) g$

This equation can be manipulated to give,

$F_b = -\beta g \rho_0 \Delta T.$

The list of variables that are used in the Buckingham π method is listed below, along with their symbols and dimensions.

Variable	Symbol	Dimensions
Significant length	$L$	$\mathrm{L}$
Fluid viscosity	$\mu$	$\mathrm{\frac{M}{L t}}$
Fluid heat capacity	$c_p$	$\mathrm{\frac{Q}{M T}}$
Fluid thermal conductivity	$k$	$\mathrm{\frac{Q}{L t T}}$
Volume expansion coefficient	$\beta$	$\mathrm{\frac{1}{T}}$
Gravitational acceleration	$g$	$\mathrm{\frac{L}{t^2}}$
Temperature difference	$\Delta T$	$\mathrm{T}$
Heat transfer coefficient	$h$	$\mathrm{\frac{Q}{L^2 t T}}$

With reference to the Buckingham π theorem there are 9 – 5 = 4 dimensionless groups. Choose L, $\mu,$ k, g and $\beta$ as the reference variables. Thus the $\pi$ groups are as follows:

$$\pi_1 = L^a \mu^b k^c \beta^d g^e c_p$$,

$$\pi_2 = L^f \mu^g k^h \beta^i g^j \rho$$,

$$\pi_3 = L^k \mu^l k^m \beta^n g^o \Delta T$$,

$$\pi_4 = L^q \mu^r k^s \beta^t g^u h$$.

Solving these $\pi$ groups gives:

$$\pi_1 = \frac{\mu(c_p)}{k} = \mathrm{Pr}$$,

$$\pi_2 =\frac{l^3 g \rho^2}{\mu^2}$$,

$$\pi_3 =\beta \Delta T$$,

$$\pi_4 =\frac{h L}{k} = \mathrm{Nu}$$

From the two groups $\pi_2$ and $\pi_3,$ the product forms the Grashof number:

$$\pi_2 \pi_3=\frac{\beta g \rho^2 \Delta T L^3}{\mu^2} = \mathrm{Gr}.$$

Taking $\nu = \frac{\mu}{\rho}$ and $\Delta T = (T_s - T_0)$ the preceding equation can be rendered as the same result from deriving the Grashof number from the energy equation.

$$\mathrm{Gr} = \frac{\beta g \Delta T L^3}{\nu^2}$$

In forced convection the Reynolds number governs the fluid flow. But, in natural convection the Grashof number is the dimensionless parameter that governs the fluid flow. Using the energy equation and the buoyant force combined with dimensional analysis provides two different ways to derive the Grashof number.

=== Physical Reasoning ===
It is also possible to derive the Grashof number by physical definition of the number as follows:

$\mathrm{Gr} = \frac{\mathrm{Buoyancy~Force}}{\mathrm{Friction~Force}} =\frac{mg}{\tau A}=\frac{L^3 \rho \beta (\Delta T) g }{\mu (V/L) L^2} =\frac{L^2 \beta (\Delta T) g}{\nu V}$

However, above expression, especially the final part at the right hand side, is slightly different from Grashof number appearing in literature. Following dimensionally correct scale in terms of dynamic viscosity can be used to have the final form.

$\mathrm{\mu} = \rho V L$Writing above scale in Gr gives;

$\mathrm{Gr} = \frac{L^3 \beta (\Delta T) g}{\nu^2 }$Physical reasoning is helpful to grasp the meaning of the number. On the other hand, following velocity definition can be used as a characteristic velocity value for making certain velocities nondimensional.

$\mathrm{V} =\frac{L^2 \beta (\Delta T) g}{\nu Gr}$

== Effects of Grashof number on the flow of different fluids ==
In a recent research carried out on the effects of Grashof number on the flow of different fluids driven by convection over various surfaces. Using slope of the linear regression line through data points, it is concluded that increase in the value of Grashof number or any buoyancy related parameter implies an increase in the wall temperature and this makes the bond(s) between the fluid to become weaker, strength of the internal friction to decrease, the gravity to becomes stronger enough (i.e. makes the specific weight appreciably different between the immediate fluid layers adjacent to the wall). The effects of buoyancy parameter are highly significant in the laminar flow within the boundary layer formed on a vertically moving cylinder. This is only achievable when the prescribed surface temperature (PST) and prescribed wall heat flux (WHF) are considered. It can be concluded that buoyancy parameter has a negligible positive effect on the local Nusselt number. This is only true when the magnitude of Prandtl number is small or prescribed wall heat flux (WHF) is considered. Sherwood number, Bejan Number, Entropy generation, Stanton Number and pressure gradient are increasing properties of buoyancy related parameter while concentration profiles, frictional force, and motile microorganism are decreasing properties.
