= Rayleigh number =

Dimensionless quantity associated with free convection of a fluid

In fluid mechanics, the Rayleigh number (Ra, after Lord Rayleigh) for a fluid is a dimensionless number associated with buoyancy-driven flow, also known as free (or natural) convection. It characterises the fluid's flow regime: a value in a certain lower range denotes laminar flow; a value in a higher range, turbulent flow. Below a certain critical value, there is no fluid motion and heat transfer is by conduction rather than convection. For most engineering purposes, the Rayleigh number is large, somewhere around 10^{6} to 10^{8}.

The Rayleigh number is defined as the product of the Grashof number (Gr), which describes the relationship between buoyancy and viscosity within a fluid, and the Prandtl number (Pr), which describes the relationship between momentum diffusivity and thermal diffusivity: Ra = Gr × Pr. Hence it may also be viewed as the ratio of buoyancy and viscosity forces multiplied by the ratio of momentum and thermal diffusivities: Ra = B/μ × ν/α. It is closely related to the Nusselt number (Nu).

== Derivation ==
The Rayleigh number describes the behaviour of fluids (such as water or air) when the mass density of the fluid is non-uniform. The mass density differences are usually caused by temperature differences. Typically a fluid expands and becomes less dense as it is heated. Gravity causes denser parts of the fluid to sink, which is called convection. Lord Rayleigh studied the case of Rayleigh-Bénard convection. When the Rayleigh number, Ra, is below a critical value for a fluid, there is no flow and heat transfer is purely by conduction; when it exceeds that value, heat is transferred by natural convection.

When the mass density difference is caused by temperature difference, Ra is, by definition, the ratio of the time scale for diffusive thermal transport to the time scale for convective thermal transport at speed $u$:

$$\mathrm{Ra} = \frac{\text{time scale for thermal transport via diffusion}}{\text{time scale for thermal transport via convection at speed}~ u}.$$

This means the Rayleigh number is a type of Péclet number. For a volume of fluid of size $l$ in all three dimensions and mass density difference $\Delta\rho$, the force due to gravity is of the order $\Delta\rho l^3g$, where $g$ is acceleration due to gravity. From the Stokes equation, when the volume of fluid is sinking, viscous drag is of the order $\eta l u$, where $\eta$ is the dynamic viscosity of the fluid. When these two forces are equated, the speed $u \sim \Delta\rho l^2 g/\eta$. Thus the time scale for transport via flow is $l/u \sim \eta/\Delta\rho lg$. The time scale for thermal diffusion across a distance $l$ is $l^2/\alpha$, where $\alpha$ is the thermal diffusivity. Thus the Rayleigh number Ra is

$$\mathrm{Ra} = \frac{l^2/\alpha}{\eta/\Delta\rho lg} = \frac{\Delta\rho l^3g}{\eta\alpha} = \frac{\rho\beta\Delta T l^3g}{\eta\alpha}$$

where we approximated the density difference $\Delta\rho=\rho\beta\Delta T$ for a fluid of average mass density $\rho$, thermal expansion coefficient $\beta$ and a temperature difference $\Delta T$ across distance $l$.

The Rayleigh number can be written as the product of the Grashof number and the Prandtl number:
$$\mathrm{Ra} = \mathrm{Gr}\mathrm{Pr}.$$

== Classical definition ==
For free convection near a vertical wall, the Rayleigh number is defined as:

$$\mathrm{Ra}_{x} = \frac{g \beta} {\nu \alpha} (T_s - T_\infty) x^3 = \mathrm{Gr}_{x}\mathrm{Pr}$$

where:

- x is the characteristic length
- Ra_{x} is the Rayleigh number for characteristic length x
- g is acceleration due to gravity
- β is the thermal expansion coefficient (equals to 1/T, for ideal gases, where T is absolute temperature).
- $\nu$ is the kinematic viscosity
- α is the thermal diffusivity
- T_{s} is the surface temperature
- T_{∞} is the quiescent temperature (fluid temperature far from the surface of the object)
- Gr_{x} is the Grashof number for characteristic length x
- Pr is the Prandtl number

In the above, the fluid properties Pr, ν, α and β are evaluated at the film temperature, which is defined as:

$$T_f = \frac{T_s + T_\infin}{2}.$$

For a uniform wall heating flux, the modified Rayleigh number is defined as:

$$\mathrm{Ra}^{*}_{x} = \frac{g \beta q''_o} {\nu \alpha k} x^4$$

where:

- q″_{o} is the uniform surface heat flux
- k is the thermal conductivity.

== Other applications ==
=== Solidifying alloys ===
The Rayleigh number can also be used as a criterion to predict convectional instabilities, such as A-segregates, in the mushy zone of a solidifying alloy. The mushy zone Rayleigh number is defined as:

$$\mathrm{Ra} = \frac{\frac{\Delta \rho}{\rho_0}g \bar{K} L}{\alpha \nu} = \frac{\frac{\Delta \rho}{\rho_0}g \bar{K} }{R \nu}$$

where:

- K̅ is the mean permeability (of the initial portion of the mush)
- L is the characteristic length scale
- α is the thermal diffusivity
- ν is the kinematic viscosity
- R is the solidification or isotherm speed.

A-segregates are predicted to form when the Rayleigh number exceeds a certain critical value. This critical value is independent of the composition of the alloy, and this is the main advantage of the Rayleigh number criterion over other criteria for prediction of convectional instabilities, such as Suzuki criterion.

Torabi Rad et al. showed that for steel alloys the critical Rayleigh number is 17. Pickering et al. explored Torabi Rad's criterion, and further verified its effectiveness. Critical Rayleigh numbers for lead–tin and nickel-based super-alloys were also developed.

=== Porous media ===
The Rayleigh number above is for convection in a bulk fluid such as air or water, but convection can also occur when the fluid is inside and fills a porous medium, such as porous rock saturated with water. Then the Rayleigh number, sometimes called the Rayleigh-Darcy number, is different. In a bulk fluid, i.e., not in a porous medium, from the Stokes equation, the falling speed of a domain of size $l$ of liquid $u \sim \Delta\rho l^2 g/\eta$. In porous medium, this expression is replaced by that from Darcy's law $u \sim \Delta\rho k g/\eta$, with $k$ the permeability of the porous medium. The Rayleigh or Rayleigh-Darcy number is then

$$\mathrm{Ra}=\frac{\rho\beta\Delta T klg}{\eta\alpha}$$

This also applies to A-segregates, in the mushy zone of a solidifying alloy.

=== Geophysical applications ===
In geophysics, the Rayleigh number is of fundamental importance: it indicates the presence and strength of convection within a fluid body such as the Earth's mantle. The mantle is a solid that behaves as a fluid over geological time scales. The Rayleigh number for the Earth's mantle due to internal heating alone, Ra_{H}, is given by:

$$\mathrm{Ra}_H = \frac{g\rho^{2}_{0}\beta HD^5}{\eta \alpha k}$$

where:

- H is the rate of radiogenic heat production per unit mass
- η is the dynamic viscosity
- k is the thermal conductivity
- D is the depth of the mantle.

A Rayleigh number for bottom heating of the mantle from the core, Ra_{T}, can also be defined as:

$$\mathrm{Ra}_T = \frac{\rho_{0}^2 g\beta\Delta T_\text{sa}D^3 C_P}{\eta k}$$

where:

- ΔT_{sa} is the superadiabatic temperature difference (the superadiabatic temperature difference is the actual temperature difference minus the temperature difference in a fluid whose entropy gradient is zero, but has the same profile of the other variables appearing in the equation of state) between the reference mantle temperature and the core–mantle boundary
- C_{P} is the specific heat capacity at constant pressure.

High values for the Earth's mantle indicates that convection within the Earth is vigorous and time-varying, and that convection is responsible for almost all the heat transported from the deep interior to the surface.

== See also ==
- Grashof number
- Prandtl number
- Reynolds number
- Péclet number
- Nusselt number
- Rayleigh–Bénard convection
