= Forced convection in porous media =

Forced convection is type of heat transport in which fluid motion is generated by an external source like a (pump, fan, suction device, etc.). Heat transfer through porus media is very effective and efficiently. Forced convection heat transfer in a confined porous medium has been a subject of intensive studies during the last decades because of its wide applications.

The basic problem in heat convection through porous media consists of predicting the heat transfer rate between a deferentially heated, solid impermeable surface and a fluid-saturated porous medium. Beginning with constant wall temperature.

In 2D steady state system

$\partial u/\partial x+\partial v/\partial y=0$

According to Darcy's law

$u=-(K/\mu)\partial P/\partial x$

$v=-(K/\mu)\partial P/\partial y$

$u\partial T/\partial x+v\partial T/\partial y = \boldsymbol{\alpha}{\partial^2\over\partial x^2}T$

$u=$$U_\infty$ $v=0$

$P(x)= -(\mu/K)U\infty x+ constant$

$\delta_t$ is the thickness of the slender layer of length x that affects the temperature transition from $T_0$ to $T_\infty$.

Balancing the energy equation between enthalpy flow in the x direction and thermal diffusion in the y direction

$U_\infty\partial T/\partial x\sim \alpha\Delta T/\delta_t^2$

boundary is slender so $\delta_t<<x$

$\delta_t/x \sim Pe_x^-.5$

$Nu = hx/K \sim x/\delta_t \sim Pe_x^0.5$

The Peclet number is a dimensionless number used in calculations involving convective heat transfer. It is the ratio of the thermal energy convected to the fluid to the thermal energy conducted within the fluid.

$Pe_x$ $=$ Advective transport rate $/$ Diffusive transport rate

$Pe_x = U_\infty x/\alpha$

== See also ==
- Darcy's law
- Nusselt Number
- Porous media
- Convective heat transfer
- Heat transfer coefficient
- Porous media
