= Stanton number =

Dimensionless parameter in fluid mechanics

The Stanton number (St), is a dimensionless number that measures the ratio of heat transferred into a fluid to the thermal capacity of fluid. The Stanton number is named after Thomas Stanton (engineer) (1865–1931). It is used to characterize heat transfer in forced convection flows.

== Formula ==
$\mathrm{St} = \frac{h}{G c_p} = \frac{h}{\rho u c_p}$

where

- h = convection heat transfer coefficient
- G = mass flux of the fluid
- ρ = density of the fluid
- c_{p} = specific heat of the fluid
- u = velocity of the fluid

It can also be represented in terms of the fluid's Nusselt, Reynolds, and Prandtl numbers:

$$\mathrm{St} = \frac{\mathrm{Nu}}{\mathrm{Re}\,\mathrm{Pr}}$$

where

- Nu is the Nusselt number;
- Re is the Reynolds number;
- Pr is the Prandtl number.

The Stanton number arises in the consideration of the geometric similarity of the momentum boundary layer and the thermal boundary layer, where it can be used to express a relationship between the shear force at the wall (due to viscous drag) and the total heat transfer at the wall (due to thermal diffusivity).

== Mass transfer ==
Using the heat-mass transfer analogy, a mass transfer St equivalent can be found using the Sherwood number and Schmidt number in place of the Nusselt number and Prandtl number, respectively.

$\mathrm{St}_m = \frac{\mathrm{Sh_L}}{\mathrm{Re_L}\,\mathrm{Sc}}$

$\mathrm{St}_m = \frac{h_m}{\rho u}$

where

- $St_m$ is the mass Stanton number;
- $Sh_L$ is the Sherwood number based on length;
- $Re_L$ is the Reynolds number based on length;
- $Sc$ is the Schmidt number;
- $h_m$ is defined based on a concentration difference (kg s^{−1} m^{−2});
- $u$ is the velocity of the fluid

== Boundary layer flow ==
The Stanton number is a useful measure of the rate of change of the thermal energy deficit (or excess) in the boundary layer due to heat transfer from a planar surface. If the enthalpy thickness is defined as:

$\Delta_2 = \int_0^\infty \frac{\rho u}{\rho_\infty u_\infty} \frac{T - T_\infty}{T_s - T_\infty} d y$

Then the Stanton number is equivalent to

$\mathrm{St} = \frac{d \Delta_2}{d x}$

for boundary layer flow over a flat plate with a constant surface temperature and properties.

=== Correlations using Reynolds-Colburn analogy ===
Using the Reynolds-Colburn analogy for turbulent flow with a thermal log and viscous sub layer model, the following correlation for turbulent heat transfer for is applicable

$\mathrm{St} = \frac{C_f / 2}{1 + 12.8 \left( \mathrm{Pr}^{0.68} - 1 \right) \sqrt{C_f / 2}}$

where

$C_f = \frac{0.455}{\left[ \mathrm{ln} \left( 0.06 \mathrm{Re}_x \right) \right]^2}$

== See also ==
Strouhal number, an unrelated number that is also often denoted as $\mathrm{St}$.
