= Wilhelm Nusselt =

German mechanical engineer and professor (1882–1957)

- Ernst Kraft Wilhelm Nußelt
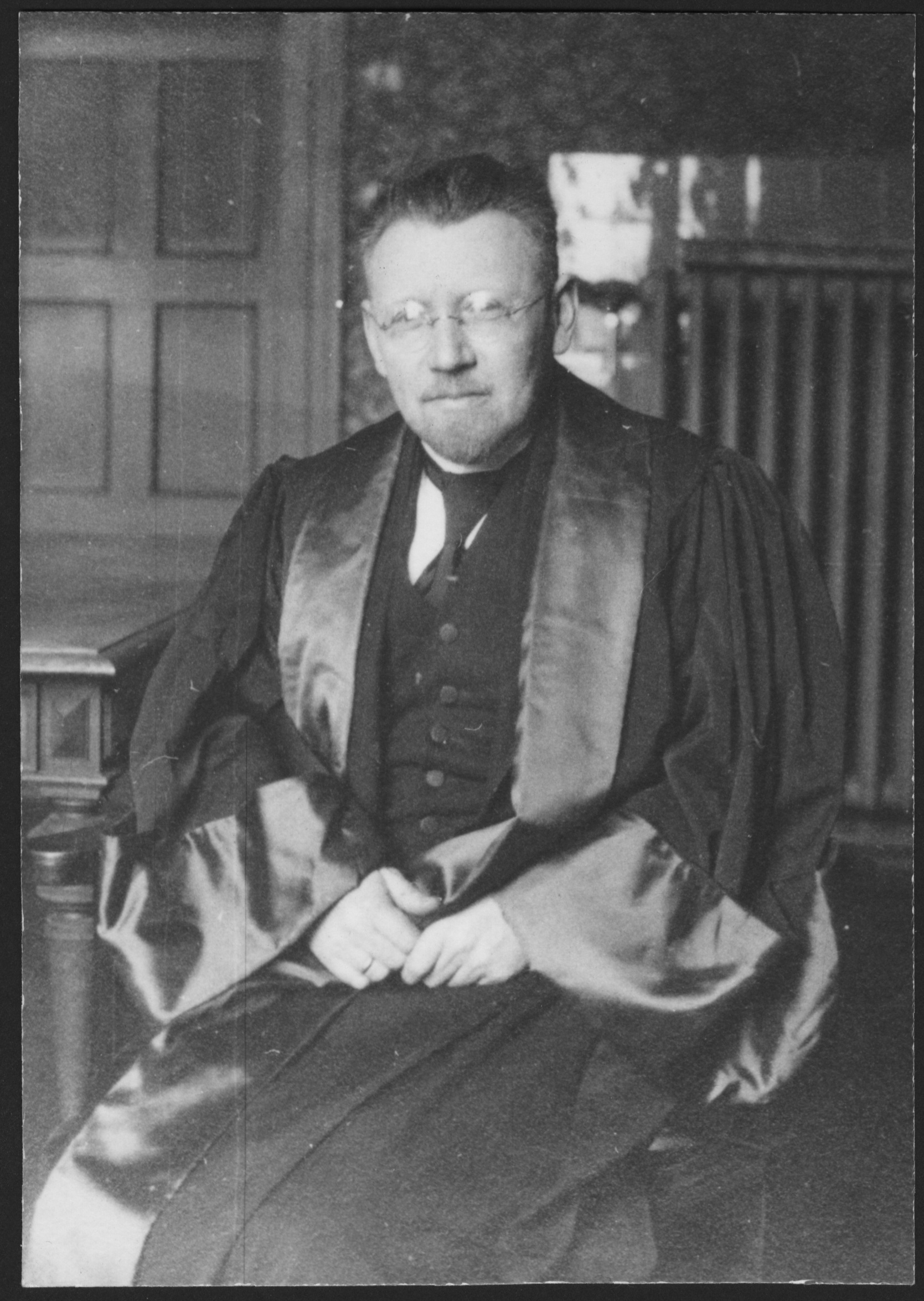
- Nusselt in his office at Technische Hochschule Karlsruhe, April 1925
- Born: 25 November 1882; Nuremberg, Kingdom of Bavaria, German Empire
- Died: 1 September 1957 (aged 74); Munich, West Germany
- Education: Technische Hochschule München
- Known for: Nondimensionalization of convective heat transfer; Theory of laminar film condensation
- Awards: Gauss Medal of Braunschweig Scientific Society; Grashof Commemorative Medal of the VDI; Elected member of the Bavarian Academy of Sciences
- Scientific career
- Fields: Thermodynamics, heat transfer, combustion
- Workplaces: Technische Hochschule München; Technische Hochschule Dresden; Technische Hochschule Karlsruhe
- Thesis: Die Wärmeleitfähigkeit von Wärmeisolierstoffen (1907)
- Doctoral advisor: Oskar Knoblauch
- Notable students: Georg Ackermann (1937)

Ernst Kraft Wilhelm Nusselt (25 November 1882 – 1 September 1957) was a German mechanical engineer whose work helped establish modern heat-transfer theory. His nondimensionalization of convective heat transfer led to a widely used framework for correlating heat-transfer data, including the dimensionless group now called the Nusselt number. His theory of laminar film condensation, which identified the condensate film as the principal resistance to heat flow, yielded mathematical solutions still used today. Both results have become standard topics in heat-transfer textbooks.

Nusselt studied mechanical engineering at the Technische Hochschule München, where he received his Dipl.-Ing. in 1904 and his Dr.-Ing. in 1907 under Oskar Knoblauch. After serving as an assistant to Richard Mollier at Technische Hochschule Dresden and working briefly in industry at Sulzer and BASF, he was appointed full professor at Technische Hochschule Karlsruhe in 1920. In 1925 he moved to the chair of theoretical mechanical engineering at Technische Hochschule München, where he remained until his retirement in 1952.

Nusselt's research touched most areas of heat transfer and heat engines. He developed experimental methods for measuring thermal conductivity, analyzed cross-flow heat exchangers and falling film evaporators, and contributed to the formulation of the analogy between heat and mass transfer. He supervised about forty doctoral dissertations during his career.

== Early life and education ==
Nusselt was born on 25 November 1882 in Nuremberg, where his father was a factory owner. After completing his primary education in Nuremberg, Nusselt studied mechanical engineering at the Technische Hochschule München and at the Technische Hochschule (Berlin-)Charlottenburg, receiving his Dipl.-Ing. (engineering diploma) in 1904 from Technische Hochschule München. He then joined the Laboratory of Technical Physics at Technische Hochschule München and studied mathematics and physics while working in Oskar Knoblauch's laboratory. He obtained his Dr.-Ing. from the same institution in 1907, writing his thesis Die Wärmeleitfähigkeit von Wärmeisolierstoffen ("The thermal conductivity of thermal insulation materials").

From 1907 to 1909, Nusselt served as an assistant to the thermodynamicist Richard Mollier at Technische Hochschule Dresden. There, he habilitated in 1909 with the work Der Wärmeübergang in Rohrleitungen ("Heat transfer in pipes"), which laid the foundation for his later publication on dimensional analysis. His habilitation thesis included careful experiments on carbon dioxide, air, and lighting gas (Leuchtgas).

== Career ==
Upon completing his habilitation, Nusselt became a privatdozent at Dresden, a position that he held until 1918. During this time, he worked for nine months in the heat technology division of Sulzer Brothers in Winterthur, Switzerland. In 1913, he returned to Dresden, where, in February 1915, he was appointed as supernumerary professor (außerplanmäßiger Professor). Nusselt was exempted from military service in World War I for health reasons.

From January 1918 until March 1920, he was employed as the head of a research laboratory (Laboratoriumsvorstand) at Badische Anilin- und Soda-Fabrik (BASF) in Ludwigshafen. Beginning in 1919, he concurrently lectured as a privatdozent at Technische Hochschule Darmstadt.

In 1920, Nusselt was appointed full professor (ordentlicher Professor) at Technische Hochschule Karlsruhe. In 1925, he took up the chair of theoretical mechanical engineering (theoretische Maschinenlehre) at Technische Hochschule München, and he became the co-director of the Laboratory for Heat Engines (jointly with August Loschge). He held these positions until his retirement in 1952. He was succeeded by another student of Knoblauch, Ernst Schmidt.

== Scientific and technical contributions ==
Nusselt's interests were wide-ranging, including notable mathematical analyses of conduction, forced convection, condensation and heat exchangers, as well as extensive experimental research. He established the use of nondimensional groups in correlating convection data. He identified the formal analogy between heat transfer and mass transfer. His work extended to thermal conductivity measurement, natural convection, combustion, thermal radiation, thermodynamics, gas dynamics, turbines, and internal combustion engines.

Nusselt charted a new direction in research on technical thermodynamics, helping to establish engineering science (Technikwissenschaften) as a rigorous discipline. Noting that the performance of heat engines is primarily determined by the temperatures within them, he considered heat transfer processes essential to the design of such equipment. Nusselt approached thermal engineering by studying simplified components of systems, rather than entire machines, with the aim of creating understanding that would allow rational design of complex systems. Further, his use of similarity, or nondimensional groups, allowed research to conform with the fundamental conservation laws of energy, momentum, and mass without solving the governing equations.

=== Thermal conductivity ===
Nusselt invented the use of a spherical shell for measuring thermal conductivity in his doctoral dissertation. The device consisted of an inner metal sphere that was electrically heated and a concentric outer metal sphere, with the test material filling the space between them. The method was attractive for its symmetry, which simplified the analysis of data, and for the absence of the edge losses inherent in planar conductivity measurements. His apparatus came to be called the Nusselt sphere, and it remained a standard technique for many decades.

During his time at BASF, Nusselt extended the technique to pressurized spheres, and he continued this work with insulating powders after moving to Munich.

=== Convective heat transfer and the Nusselt number ===
Nusselt's habilitation thesis was an experimental study of heat transfer to gases flowing in tubes. He correlated his data for the heat transfer coefficient using a dimensionless group raised to a power. In a related paper, he performed a separation of variables analysis of thermally developing laminar flow in a tube, which exposed the variation of the heat transfer coefficient near the inlet, and he noted that this variation directly affected existing measurements of heat transfer coefficients. (Nusselt was unaware of the earlier work by the physicist Leo Graetz. This problem is sometimes called the Graetz–Nusselt problem.)

While at Dresden, Nusselt nondimensionalized the equations governing convective heat transfer, including both forced convection and natural convection, in a paper published in 1915. His approach reduced an array of experimental parameters (such as fluid properties, velocities, and dimensions) into a much smaller number of variables that could be directly compared across different experiments and laboratories. This framework created a means of correlating heat-transfer data that has been used extensively and is a standard topic in heat-transfer textbooks.

The Nusselt number, now widely used in heat-transfer engineering, appeared as an unnamed group in his 1915 paper and was formally named in his honor by the Association of German Engineers (VDI) in 1931. In that paper, Nusselt also identified the groups now called the Grashof number, the Prandtl number, and the Reynolds number.

In 1933, A. P. Colburn used the term "Nusselt number" in his paper on convection correlations. In 1936, Sieder and Tate wrote that they correlated data "using dimensionless groups after the manner of Nusselt". The Nusselt number was added to American Standards Association nomenclature in 1943. By the time of his death, the term Nusselt number, abbreviated Nu, had been adopted globally.

Nusselt used his method to correlate data for natural convection in his 1915 paper and for forced convection in a 1917 paper. He continued to refine these correlations throughout his career, particularly as the role of the Prandtl number became more apparent. Eventually, he correlated data for natural convection on a horizontal cylinder over thirteen orders of magnitude in the product of Grashof and Prandtl numbers, using that product as the sole independent variable.

=== Film condensation ===
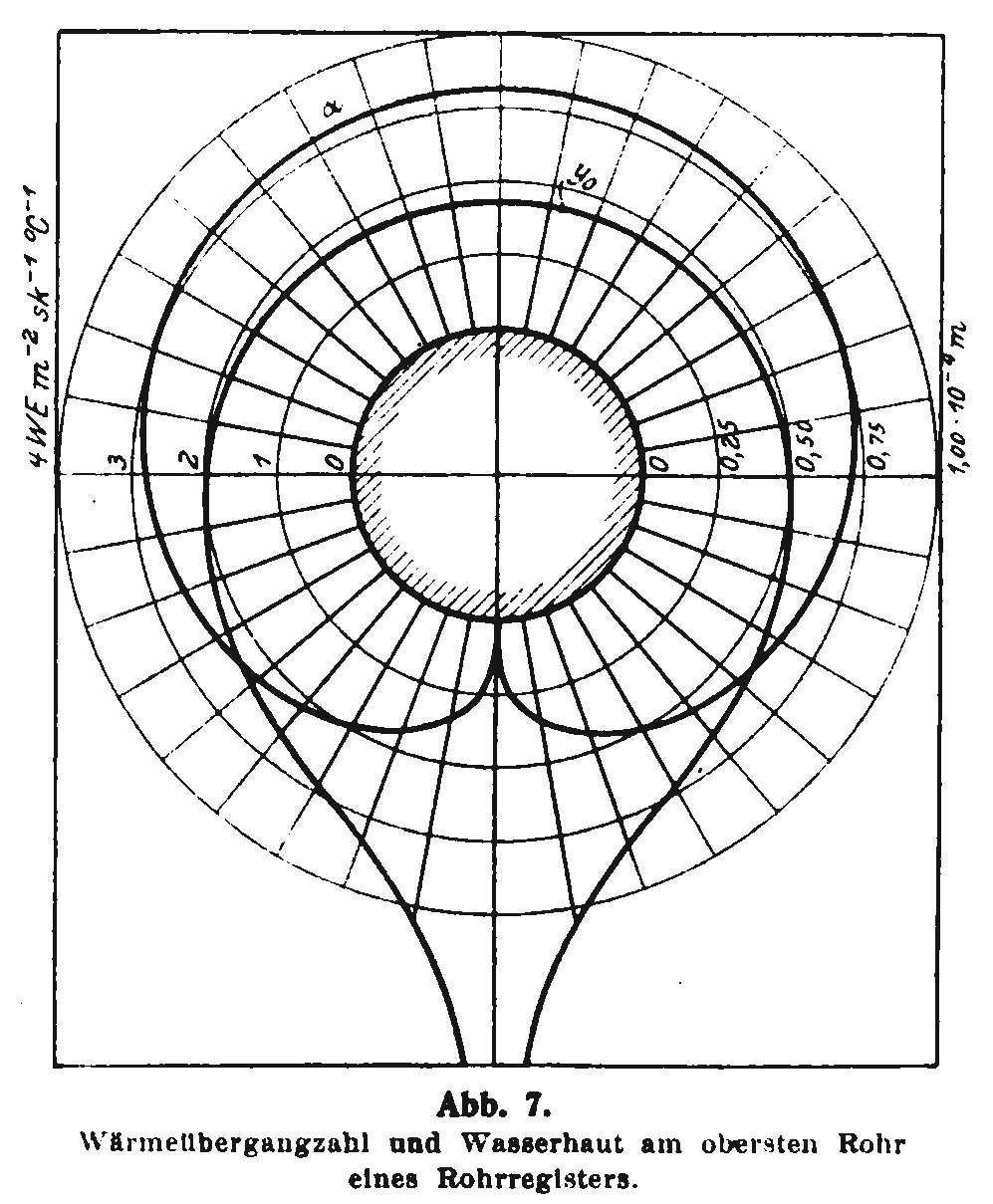
The thickness of the water film, y, and heat transfer coefficient, α, for the uppermost tube of a tube bank, with a tube diameter of 0.026 m, at a steam pressure of 1 atm, and a wall temperature of 90°C (from Nusselt's 1916 paper).

In 1916, Nusselt published an analysis of the condensation of steam into a liquid film on a cooled surface, which identified the condensate film as the principal resistance to heat flow. His paper provided mathematical solutions for condensation on a vertical plate and on the outside of a horizontal tube. His model describes the thickening of the downward-flowing film of liquid as steam condenses on its surface and the increasing resistance to heat flow as the film grows. His theory agrees well with experimental data, and it has also become a standard part of textbooks on heat transfer.

Nusselt's theory applied not only to a single horizontal tube, but also to each tube in a vertical stack. His results enabled the calculation of the condensation heat transfer coefficient at each angle around each individual tube.

=== Coupled heat and mass transfer ===
Nusselt described coupled heat and mass transfer processes in a 1916 paper on pulverized-coal combustion. He showed that the rate of combustion was controlled by the rate of diffusion. That work set the direction for subsequent research in the area, and it contributed to the early development of the analogy between heat transfer and mass transfer. In 1930, Nusselt published a comprehensive study showing the equivalence of the differential equations governing heat transfer and evaporation. However, he also recognized that the nonzero surface velocity caused by mass transfer limits the full equivalence of heat and mass transfer because the boundary conditions differ. In a 1937 dissertation, Nusselt's student Georg Ackermann derived what is now called the Ackermann correction, which accounts for the effect of mass transfer on the heat transfer coefficient.

=== Other contributions ===
Nusselt studied falling film evaporators, then gaining use in the chemical industry, first during his time at BASF, and more formally during his professorship at Karlsruhe in the early 1920s. The method followed his approach to film condensation, and a subsequent dissertation under his supervision extended the approach to horizontal tubes and tube bundles.

By 1911, Nusselt had mathematically analyzed cross-flow heat exchangers, such as those found in automobile radiators. He returned to the problem in a 1930 paper that gave a rigorous analysis of the governing differential equations, which enabled the calculation of the outlet temperature for various conditions.

At Munich, Nusselt supervised many dissertations on internal combustion engines throughout the 1930s and again after World War II. He explored the causes of knock in Otto engines. His research publications also addressed thermal radiation, gas dynamics, gas turbines, steam turbines, and various thermal process equipment. Beyond research, Nusselt wrote a two-volume textbook on technical thermodynamics, published in 1934 (volume 1) and 1944 (volume 2).

=== Mentorship ===
In all, Nusselt guided about forty doctoral dissertations. A tribute from his former students recalled that he was strict as a teacher yet his human kindness made him stimulating and inspiring influence on their research. Another former student, Günter Lück, added that passing one of Nusselt's oral examinations was a mark of genuine ability, since Nusselt demanded quick understanding and independent scientific thinking grounded in exact knowledge.

== Recognition ==
In 1922, Nusselt was appointed to the board of trustees (Kuratorium) of the Physikalisch-Technische Reichsanstalt (PTR) in recognition of his work. The PTR was Germany's national institute for metrology and physical-technical research, and its board included leading physicists of the era. Nusselt succeeded Carl von Linde as the representative for technical thermodynamics. The PTR's board was dissolved in 1935 by its president, Johannes Stark—a Nobel laureate and ardent National Socialist—who sought to impose the Führerprinzip on the institution.

Nusselt received honorary doctorates from the Technische Hochschule der Freien Stadt Danzig (in the Free City of Danzig) in 1929 and from the Technische Hochschule Dresden in 1953.

His other honors included the Grashof Commemorative Medal of the Verein Deutscher Ingenieure (VDI) and the Gauss Medal of the Braunschweig Scientific Society, both in 1951. The citation for the Gauss Medal states "... für seine grundlegenden Arbeiten, die den Wärmeübergang aus dem Gebiet der Empirie in den Bereich der Wissenschaften gehoben haben" (...for his fundamental works that elevated heat transfer from the realm of empiricism into the domain of science).

In 1953, he was elected a full member of the Bavarian Academy of Sciences.

== Personal life ==
Nusselt married Susanne Thürmer (1892–1971) on 12 December 1917. They had two daughters and a son.

Nusselt was an avid mountaineer and skier. Lück, recalling that physical vigor and relaxation were as essential to Nusselt's intellectual work as exact thinking, wrote that even in his later years those who joined him in the mountains could feel how deeply his alpine pursuits sustained his work. His son Dietrich was also a mountaineer; in 1947, Dietrich fell to his death from the east wall of the Riffelkopf. Schmidt later wrote that the loss struck Nusselt all the harder for his own deep love of nature and the mountains.

Nusselt died in Munich on 1 September 1957, after a heart attack, and is buried at Munich's Ostfriedhof Cemetery. In his memorial article, Ernst Schmidt—who succeeded Nusselt at Munich—wrote of him: "Nußelts aufrechter Charakter und seine klare kritische Art erlaubten keine Konzessionen an das vergangene Regime. Aller äußere Schein war seinem Wesen fremd." ("Nusselt's upright character and his clear, critical nature permitted no concessions to the former regime. All outward pretense was alien to his nature.")

== Selected works ==
- Nusselt, Wilhelm (15 October 1915). "Das Grundgesetz des Wärmeüberganges" [The Basic Laws of Heat Transfer]. Gesundheits-Ingenieur (in German). 38 (42): 477–482. hdl:2027/mdp.39015084678260.; concluded in Nusselt, Wilhelm (23 October 1915). "Das Grundgesetz des Wärmeüberganges (Schluß)". Gesundheits-Ingenieur (in German). 38 (43): 490–496. hdl:2027/mdp.39015084678260. English translation: Nusselt, Wilhelm (1957). The Basic Laws of Heat Transfer (Report). Translated by Wachmann, C.; Brown, W. G. National Research Council of Canada. NRC Technical Translation TT-587.
- Nusselt, Wilhelm (1916). "Die Oberflächenkondensation des Wasserdampfes" [The Surface Condensation of Water Vapor]. Zeitschrift des Vereines Deutscher Ingenieure (in German). 60 (27): 541–546. hdl:2027/uc1.c2606100.; concluded in Nusselt, Wilhelm (1916). "Die Oberflächenkondensation des Wasserdampfes (Schluß)". Zeitschrift des Vereines Deutscher Ingenieure (in German). 60 (28): 569–575. hdl:2027/uc1.c2606100.
- Nusselt, Wilhelm (5 February 1916). "Die Verbrennung und Vergasung der Kohle auf dem Rost" [The Combustion and Gasification of Coal on the Grate]. Zeitschrift des Vereines Deutscher Ingenieure (in German). 60 (6): 102–107. hdl:2027/uc1.c2606099.
- Nusselt, Wilhelm (August 1930). "Der Einfluß der Gastemperatur auf den Wärmeübergang im Rohr" [The Influence of Gas Temperature on Heat Transfer in the Pipe]. Technische Mechanik und Thermodynamik (in German). 1 (8): 277–289. doi:10.1007/BF02640201.
- Nusselt, Wilhelm (December 1930). "Eine neue Formel für den Wärmeübergang im Kreuzstrom" [A New Formula for Heat Transfer in Cross-Flow]. Technische Mechanik und Thermodynamik (in German). 1 (12): 417–422. doi:10.1007/BF02640212.
- Nusselt, Wilhelm (April 1930). "Wärmeübergang, Diffusion und Verdunstung" [Heat Transfer, Diffusion and Evaporation]. Zeitschrift für angewandte Mathematik und Mechanik (in German). 10 (2): 105–121. Bibcode:1930ZaMM...10..105N. doi:10.1002/zamm.19300100202. hdl:2027/mdp.39015024289004. English translation: Nusselt, Wilhelm (April 1954). Heat Transfer, Diffusion and Evaporation (Report). Translated by Lowell, H. H. National Advisory Committee for Aeronautics. NACA Technical Memorandum 1367.
- Nusselt, Wilhelm (1934). Technische Thermodynamik [Technical Thermodynamics: Basics]. Sammlung Göschen (in German). Vol. 1: Grundlagen (1st ed.). Berlin and Leipzig: Walter de Gruyter. OCLC 174411343.
- Nusselt, Wilhelm (1944). Technische Thermodynamik [Technical Thermodynamics: Theory of Heat Engines]. Sammlung Göschen (in German). Vol. 2: Theorie der Wärmekraftmaschinen. Berlin: Walter de Gruyter. OCLC 841846902.
