= Péclet number =

Ratio of a fluid's advective and diffusive transport rates

In continuum mechanics, the Péclet number (Pe, after Jean Claude Eugène Péclet) is a class of dimensionless numbers relevant in the study of transport phenomena in a continuous environment. It is defined to be the ratio of the rate of advection of a physical quantity by the flow to the rate of diffusion of the same quantity driven by an appropriate gradient. In the context of species or mass transfer, the Péclet number is the product of the Reynolds number and the Schmidt number (Re × Sc). In the context of the thermal fluids, the thermal Péclet number is equivalent to the product of the Reynolds number and the Prandtl number (Re × Pr).

== Definition ==
Plan view: For $Pe_L \to 0$, advection is negligible, and diffusion dominates mass transport.

The Péclet number is defined as
$$\mathrm{Pe} = \dfrac{\text{advective transport rate}}{\text{diffusive transport rate}}.$$

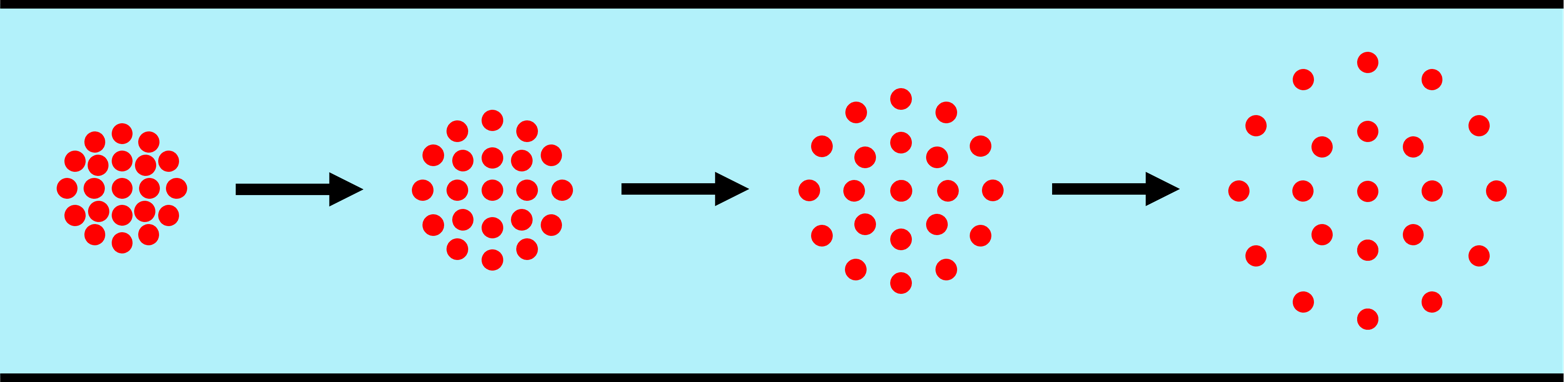
Plan view: For $Pe_L = 1$, diffusion and advection occur over equal times, and both have a non-negligible influence on mass transport.

== Usages ==
=== Mass transfer ===
For mass transfer, it is defined as
$$\mathrm{Pe}_L = \frac{L u}{D} = \mathrm{Re}_L \, \mathrm{Sc},$$

where L is the characteristic length, u the local flow velocity, D the mass diffusion coefficient, Re the Reynolds number, Sc the Schmidt number.

Such ratio can also be re-written in terms of times, as a ratio between the characteristic temporal intervals of the system:
$$\mathrm{Pe}_L = \frac{u/L}{D/L^2} = \frac{L^2/D}{L/u} = \frac{\text{diffusion time}}{\text{advection time}}.$$

For $\mathrm{Pe_L} \gg 1$ the diffusion happens in a much longer time compared to the advection, and therefore the latter of the two phenomena predominates in the mass transport.

=== Heat transfer ===
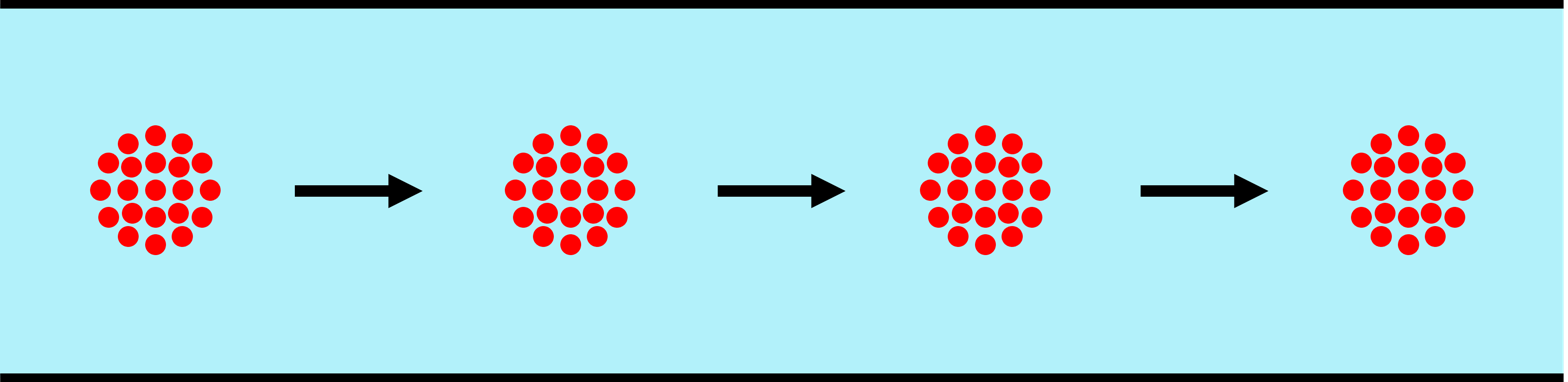
Plan view: For $Pe_L \rightarrow \infty$, diffusion is negligible, and advection dominates mass transport.

For heat transfer, the Péclet number is defined as
$$\mathrm{Pe}_L = \frac{L u}{\alpha} = \mathrm{Re}_L \, \mathrm{Pr},$$
where Pr the Prandtl number, and α the thermal diffusivity,
$$\alpha = \frac{k}{\rho c_p},$$
where k is the thermal conductivity, ρ the density, and c_{p} the specific heat capacity.

== Engineering applications ==
In engineering applications, the Péclet number is often very large. In such situations, the dependency of the flow upon downstream locations is diminished, and variables in the flow tend to become "one-way" properties. Thus, when modelling certain situations with high Péclet numbers, simpler computational models can be adopted.

A flow will often have different Péclet numbers for heat and mass. This can lead to the phenomenon of double diffusive convection.

In the context of particulate motion, the Péclet number has also been called Brenner number, with symbol Br, in honour of Howard Brenner.

== Other usages ==
The Péclet number also finds applications beyond transport phenomena, as a general measure for the relative importance of the random fluctuations and of the systematic average behavior in mesoscopic systems.

== See also ==
- Nusselt number
