= Mina Hoorfar =

Iranian-Canadian mechanical engineer

Mina Hoorfar is an Iranian and Canadian mechanical engineer, specializing in microfluidics and thermofluidics. She is dean of the School of Engineering and Computer Science and professor of mechanical engineering at the University of Victoria.

== Education and career ==
Hoorfar studied mechanical engineering as an undergraduate at the University of Tehran. Despite failing her first year's courses, overwhelmed at being "the only female student among a hundred young men", she persevered in her studies and completed her degree as the best student in her class. She came to Canada in 1998 to continue her studies at the University of Toronto, where she received a master's degree in 2001 and completed her Ph.D. in 2005. Her dissertation, Development of a third generation of axisymmetric drop shape analysis (ADSA), was supervised by A. Wilhelm Neumann.

She was one of the founders of the School of Engineering at the University of British Columbia Okanagan, where she worked for 15 years and served as director of the school for six years. She was named dean of the School of Engineering and Computer Science at the University of Victoria in 2021. She is the first woman to become dean of the school.

She was the president of the Canadian Society for Mechanical Engineering from 2020 to 2022.

== Recognition ==
Hoorfar became a Fellow of the Canadian Society for Mechanical Engineering (CSME) in 2020, and was the 2021 recipient of the CSME Emerging Technologies Medal. She was named to the Canadian Academy of Engineering in 2023.
