= Bulk temperature =

In thermofluids dynamics, the bulk temperature, or the average bulk temperature in the thermal fluid, is a convenient reference point for evaluating properties related to convective heat transfer, particularly in applications related to flow in pipes and ducts.

The concept of the bulk temperature is that adiabatic mixing of the fluid from a given cross section of the duct will result in some equilibrium temperature that accurately reflects the average temperature of the moving fluid, more so than a simple average like the film temperature.
