= Conjugate convective heat transfer =

The contemporary conjugate convective heat transfer model was developed after computers came into wide use in order to substitute the empirical relation of proportionality of heat flux to temperature difference with heat transfer coefficient which was the only tool in theoretical heat convection since the times of Newton. This model, based on a strictly mathematically stated problem, describes the heat transfer between a body and a fluid flowing over or inside it as a result of the interaction of two objects. The physical processes and solutions of the governing equations are considered separately for each object in two subdomains. Matching conditions for these solutions at the interface provide the distributions of temperature and heat flux along the body–flow interface, eliminating the need for a heat transfer coefficient. Moreover, it may be calculated using these data.

== History ==
The problem of heat transfer in the presence of liquid flowing around the body was first formulated and solved as a coupled problem by Theodore L. Perelman in 1961, who also coined the term conjugate problem of heat transfer. Later T. L. Perelman, in collaboration with A.V. Luikov, developed this approach further. At that time, many other researchers started to solve simple problems using different approaches and joining the solutions for body and fluid on their interface. A review of early conjugate solutions may be found in the book by Dorfman.

== Conjugate problem formulation ==
The conjugate convective heat transfer problem is governed by the set of equations consisting in conformity with physical pattern of two separate systems for body and fluid domains which incorporate the following equations:

=== Body domain ===
Unsteady or steady (Laplace or Poisson) two-or three-dimensional conduction equations or simplified one-dimensional equations for thin bodies

=== Fluid domain ===
- For laminar flow: Navier–Stokes and energy equations or simplified equations: boundary layer for large and creeping flow for small Reynolds numbers, respectively.
- For turbulent flow: Reynolds average Navier–Stokes and energy equations or boundary layer equations for large Reynolds numbers

=== Initial, boundary and conjugate conditions ===
- Conditions specifying the spatial distributions of variables for dynamic and thermal equations at initial time
- No-slip condition on the body and other usual conditions for dynamic equations
- Conditions of the first or the second kind specifying temperature or heat flux distribution on the domain boundaries
- Conjugate conditions on the body/fluid interface providing continuity of the thermal fields by specifying the equalities of temperatures and heat fluxes of a body and a flow at the vicinity of interface: T(+) = T(-), q(+) = q(-).

== Methods of conjugation body-fluid separation solutions ==
=== Numerical methods ===
One simple way to realize conjugation is to apply the iterations. The idea of this approach is that each solution for the body or for the fluid produces a boundary condition for other components of the system. The process starts by assuming that one of conjugate conditions exists on the interface. Then, one solves the problem for body or for fluid applying the guessing boundary condition and uses the result as a boundary condition for solving a set of equations for another component, and so on. If this process converges, the desired accuracy may be achieved. However, the rate of convergence highly depends on the first guessing condition, and there is no way to find a proper one, except through trial and error.

Another numerical conjugate procedure is grounded on the simultaneous solution of a large set of governing equations for both subdomains and conjugate conditions. Patankar proposed a method and software for such solutions using one generalized expression for continuously computing the velocities and temperature fields through the whole problem domain while satisfying the conjugate boundary conditions.

=== Analytical reducing to conduction problem ===
As shown, the well-known Duhamel's integral for heat flux on a plate with arbitrary variable temperature is a sum of series of consequent temperature derivatives. This series in fact is a general boundary condition which becomes a condition of the third kind in the first approximation. Each of those two expressions in the form of Duhamel's integral or in a series of derivatives reduces a conjugate problem to the solution of only the conduction equation for the body at given conjugate conditions. An example of an early conjugate problem solution using Duhamel's integral has been performed. This approach has been applied both in integral and in series forms and is generalized for laminar and turbulent flows with pressure gradient, for flows at wide range of Prandtl and Reynolds numbers, for compressible flow, for power-law non-Newtonian fluids, for flows with unsteady temperature variations and some other more specific cases.

== Applications ==
Starting from simple examples in the 1960s, the conjugate heat transfer methods have become a more powerful tool for modeling and investigating nature phenomena and engineering systems in different areas ranging from aerospace and nuclear reactors to thermal goods treatment and food processing, from complex procedures in medicine to atmosphere/ocean thermal interaction in meteorology, and from relatively simple units to multistage, nonlinear processes. A detailed review of more than 100 examples of conjugate modeling selected from a list of 200 early and modern publications shows that conjugate methods is now used extensively in a wide range of applications. That also is confirmed by numerous results published after this book appearance (2009) that one may see, for example, at the Web of Science. The applications in specific areas of conjugate heat transfer at periodic boundary conditions and in exchanger ducts are considered in two recent books.
