= Heat transfer enhancement =

Process of increasing the effectiveness of heat exchangers

Heat transfer enhancement is the process of increasing the effectiveness of heat exchangers. This can be achieved when the heat-transfer power of a given device is increased or when the pressure losses generated by the device are reduced. A variety of techniques can be applied to this effect, including generating strong secondary flows or increasing boundary-layer turbulence.

== Principle ==
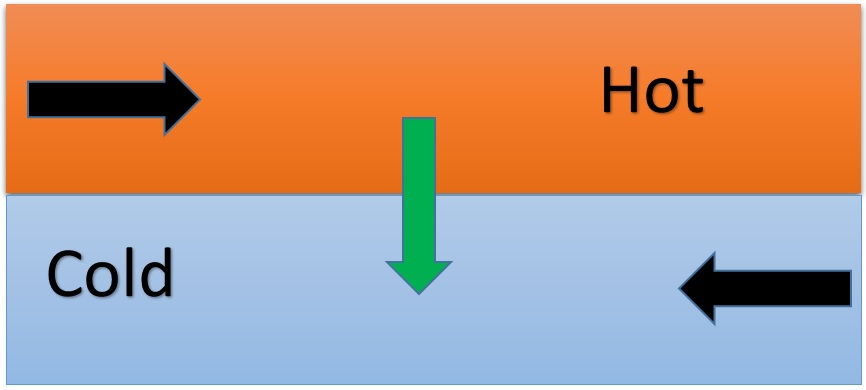
Two fluid counter-flow

During the earliest attempts to enhance heat transfer, plain (or smooth) surfaces were used. This surface requires a special surface geometry able to provide higher ${hA}$ values per unit surface area in comparison with a plain surface. The ratio of ${hA}$ of an enhanced heat-transfer surface to the plain surface is called the Enhancement Ratio $E_h$. Thus,

$$E_h= \frac{hA}{(hA)_p}.$$

The heat-transfer rate for a two-fluid counterflow heat exchanger is given by

$$Q=UA\Delta T_m.$$

In order to better illustrate the benefits of enhancement, the total length L of the tube is multiplied and divided in the equation

$$Q= \frac{UA}{L}L\Delta T_m,$$

where $\frac{L}{UA}$ is the overall thermal resistance per unit tube length. It is given by

$$\frac{L}{UA} = \frac{L}{\eta_1 h_1 A_1} + \frac{Lt_w}{k_w A_m} + \frac{L}{\eta_2 h_2 A_2}.$$

The subscripts 1 and 2 describe the two different fluids. The surface efficiency is represented by ${\eta}$ employing extended surfaces. One aspect to take into consideration is that the latter equation does not include any fouling resistances due to its simplicity, which can be important. In order to enhance the performance of the heat exchanger, the term UA/L must be increased. For achieving a reduced thermal resistance, the enhanced surface geometry may be used to increase one or both terms hA/L in relation to the plain surfaces, leading to a reduced thermal resistance per unit tube length, L/UA. This reduced term may be used to achieve one of the following three objectives:

1. Size reduction. Keeping the heat exchange rate ${Q}$ constant, the length of the heat exchanger may be reduced, providing a heat exchanger of smaller proportions.
2. Increased ${UA}$.
  1. Reduced ${\Delta t_m}$: maintaining both ${Q}$ and the length constant, ${\Delta t_m}$ can be reduced increasing thermodynamic efficiency, leading to reduced operation costs.
  2. Increased heat exchange: Increasing UA/L and keeping a constant length will lead to an increased ${Q}$ for fixed fluid inlet temperature.
3. Reduced pumping power for fixed heat duty. This will require smaller velocities of operation than the plain surface and an increased frontal area.

Depending on the objectives for the design, any of the three different performance improvements can be used on an enhanced surface.

== Internal flow ==
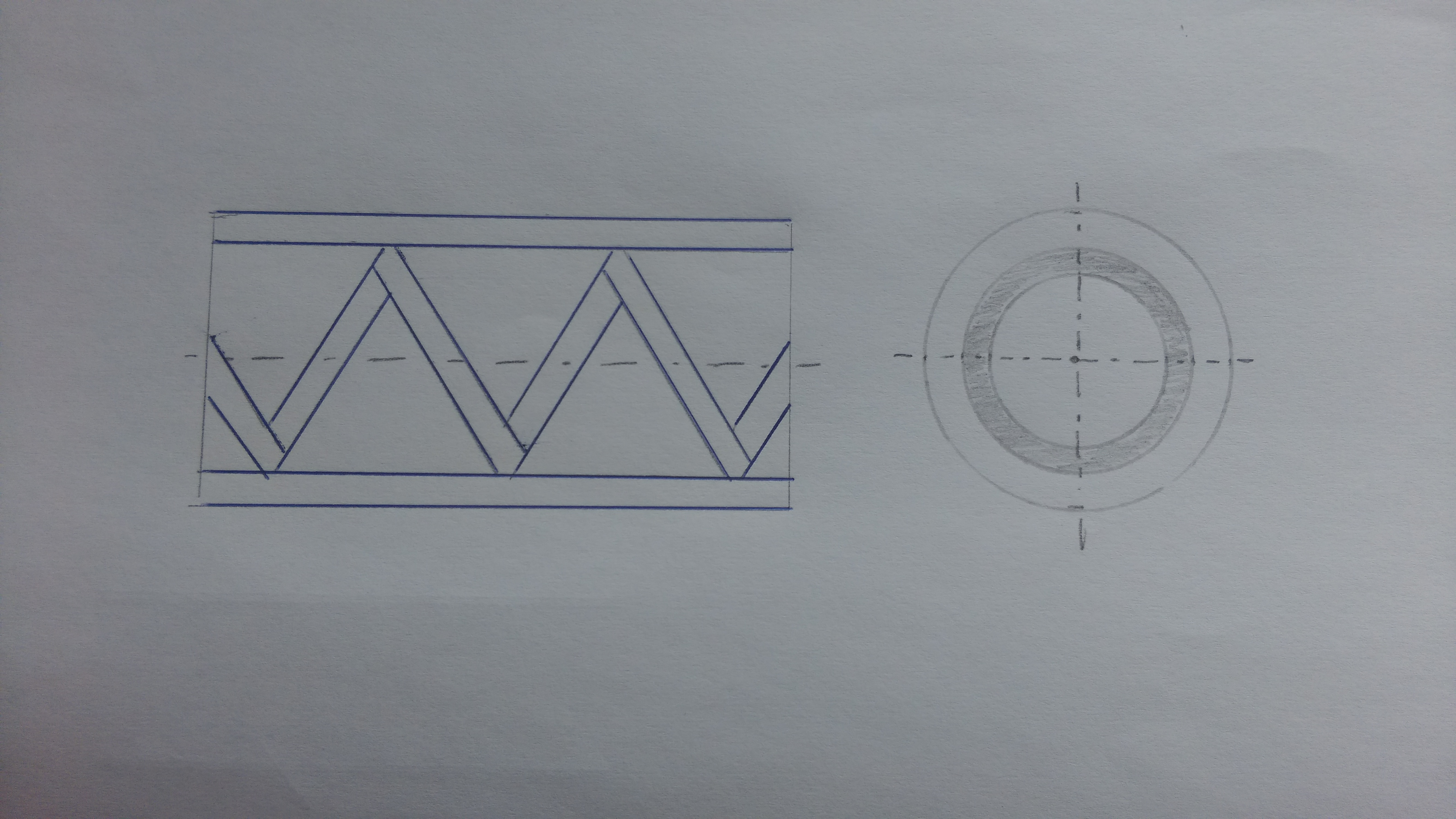
Coil spring wire insert

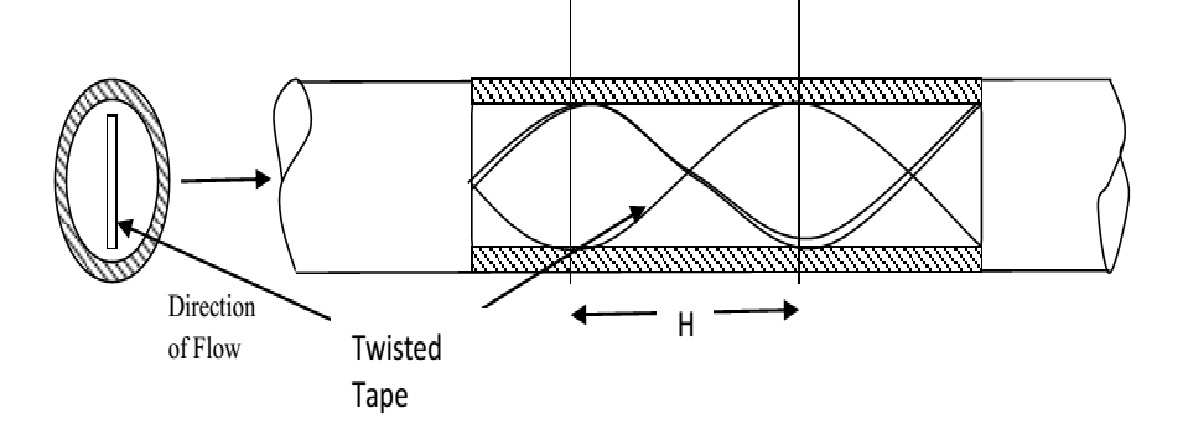
Twisted tape tube Insert

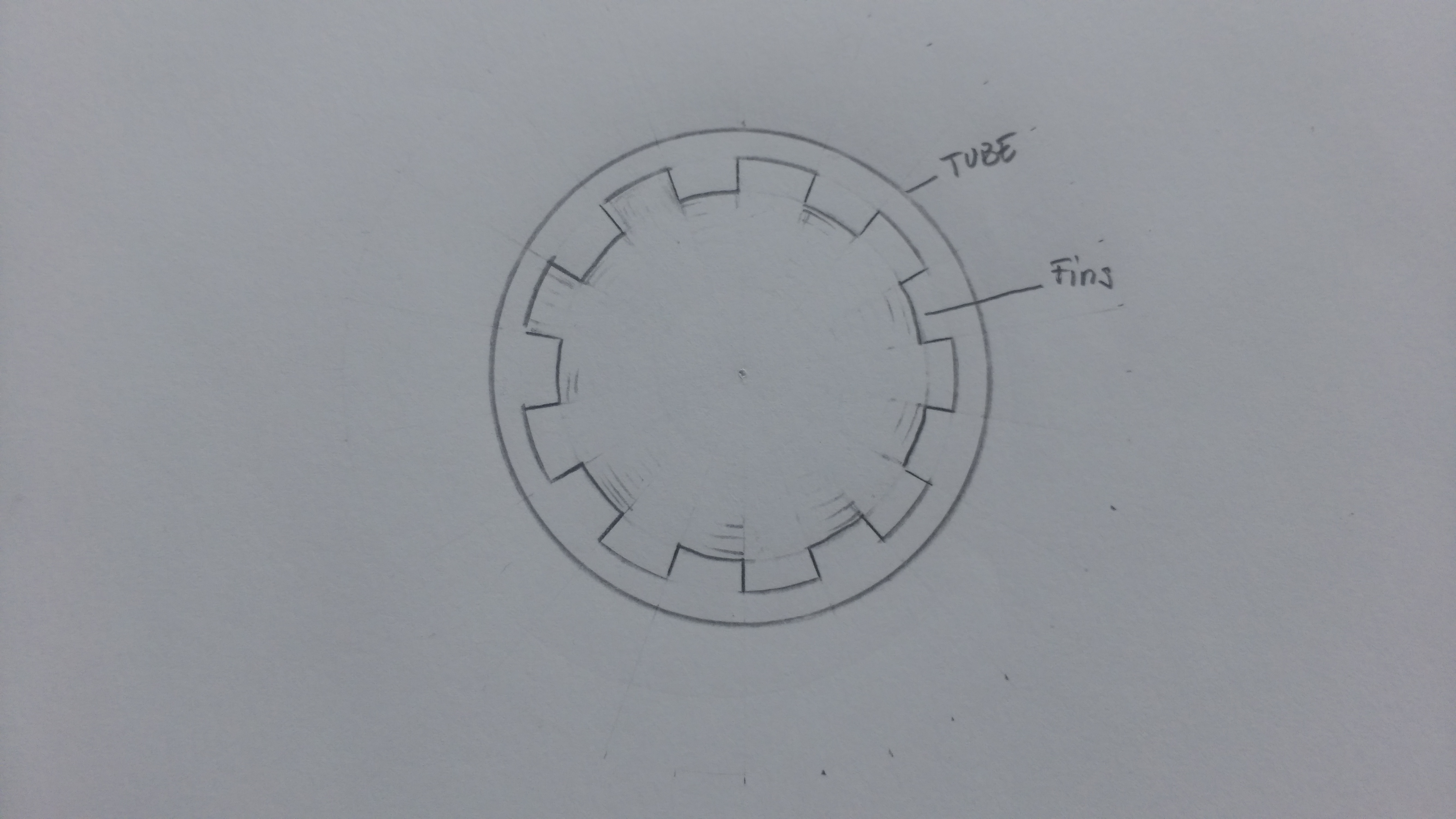
Longitudinal fins

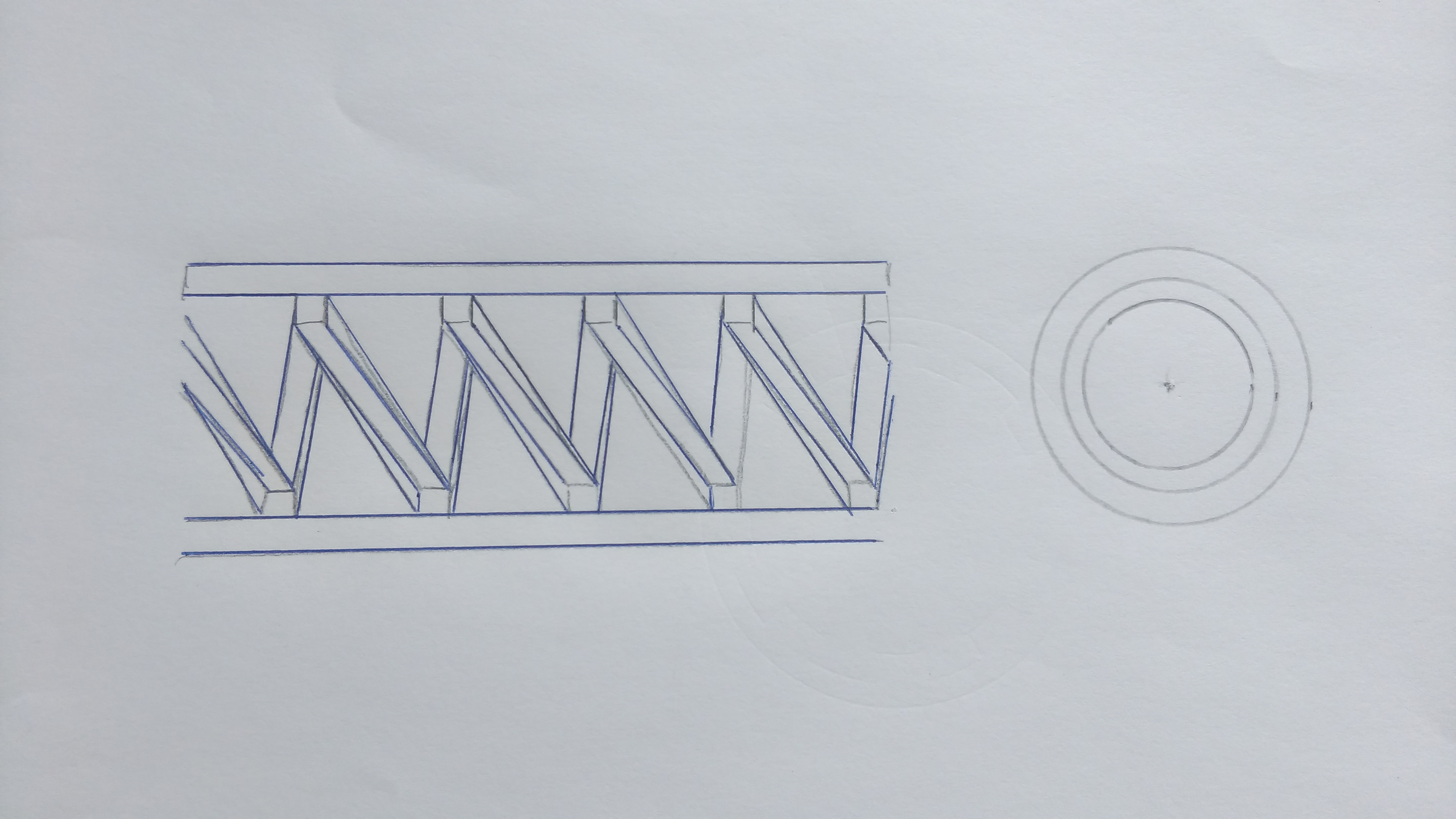
Helical ribs

There are several available options for enhancing heat transfer. The enhancement can be achieved by increasing the surface area for convection or increasing the convection coefficient. For example, surface roughness can be used to increase ${h}$ in order to enhance turbulence. This can be achieved through machining or other kinds of insertions like coil-spring wire. The insert provides a helical roughness in contact with the surface. The convection coefficient may also be increased by an insert of a twisted tape that consists of a periodical twist through 360 degrees. Tangential inserts optimize the velocity of the flow near the tube wall, while providing a bigger heat transfer area. Increased area and convection coefficient can be achieved by applying spiral fin or rib inserts. Other aspects, such as pressure drop, must be taken into consideration in order to meet the fan or pump-power constraints.

=== Helically Coiled Tube ===
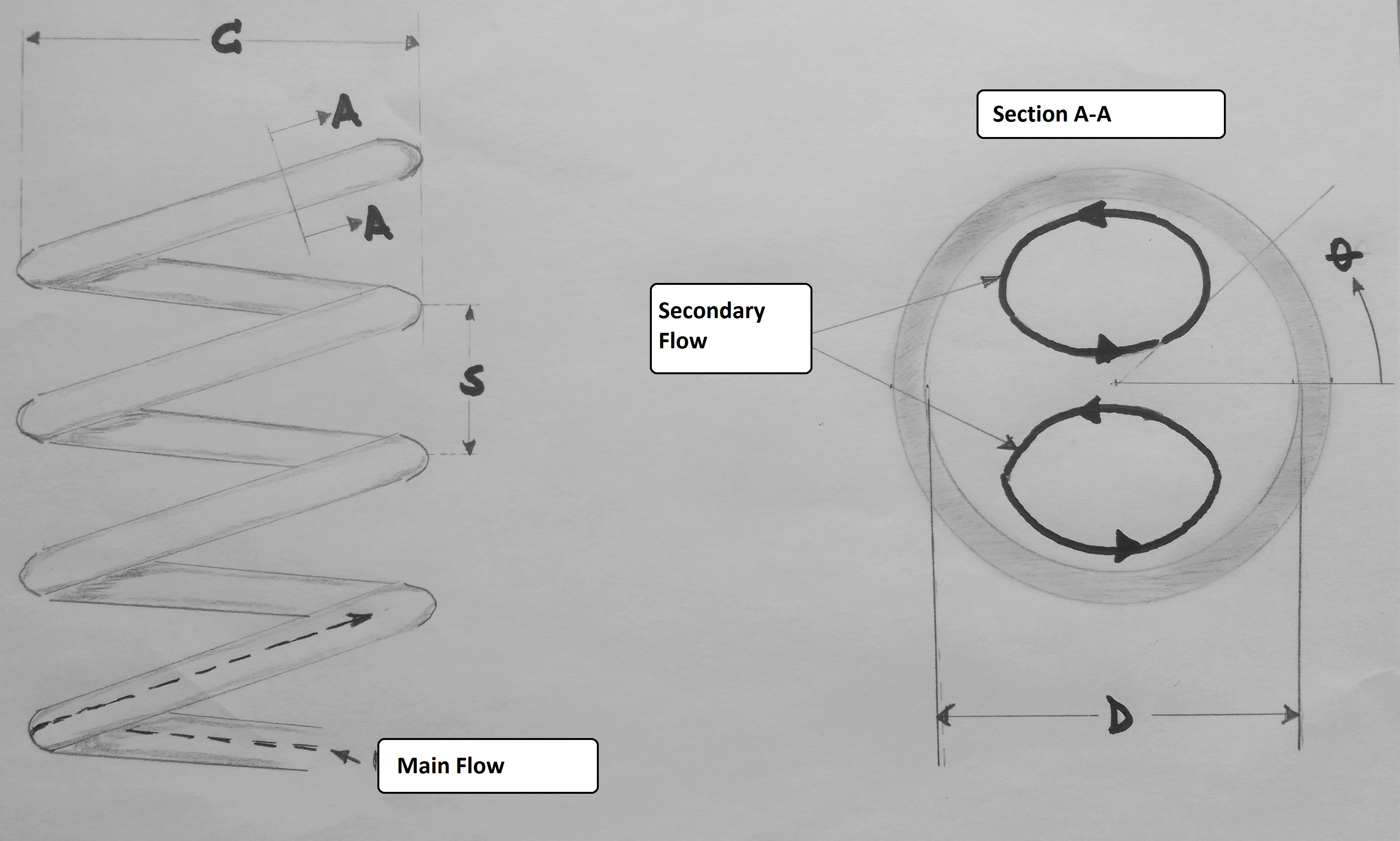
Helically coiled tube with secondary flow

The coil-spring insert may enhance heat transfer without turbulence or additional heat transfer surface area. A secondary flow is induced in the fluid, creating two longitudinal vortices. This could result in highly non-uniform local ${h}$ around the periphery of the tube, leading to a dependence of the local heat transfer coefficients on the different locations along the tube (${x}$). Supposing that the conditions for the heat flux are constant, the mean fluid temperature, ${T_m(x)}$ can be estimated as follows:

$T_m(x)= T_m,_i + \frac{q''_s P}{\dot{m}c_p} x$ where ${q''_s}$ is constant.

Maximum fluid temperatures near the tube wall are present when the fluid is heated, and because the heat transfer coefficient depends strongly on angle ($\phi$), the calculation of the maximum local temperature is not straightforward. For this purpose, correlations for the peripherally averaged Nusselt number are of little use when keeping heat-flux conditions constant. On the other hand, correlations for the peripherally averaged Nusselt number for constant wall temperature are very useful.

The secondary flow increases heat transfer rates, increases friction loses, decreases entrance length, and reduces the difference between the laminar and turbulent heat transfer rates, in contrast to the straight tube case.

The coil pitch S has negligible influence on the pressure drop and the heat-transfer rates. For the helical tube, the critical Reynolds number to the onset of turbulence is

$$Re_{D,c,h}=Re_{D,c} \left( 1+12(D/C)^{0.5} \right),$$

where $Re_{D,c}$ is given by $Re_{D,c}\approx 2300$ in a turbulent and fully developed state.

The delays on the transition from laminar to turbulent state are strongly dependent on strong secondary flows associated with tightly-wound, helically-coiled tubes. The friction factor for fully developed laminar flow with ${C/D \ge 3}$ is

$$f = \frac{64}{Re_D},$$

where $Re_D(D/C)^{0.5}\le 30$, C is the outer diameter of the helical coil, and

$f={27\over Re_D^{0.725}}(D/C)^{0.1375}$ for $30\le Re_D(D/C)^{0.5}\le 300$

and

$f={7.2\over Re_D^{0.5}}(D/C)^{0.25}$ where $300\le Re_D(D/C)^{0.5}$

For cases where $C/D\le 3$, there are available recommendations provided by Shah and Joshi. The heat-transfer coefficient may be used in the equation for Newton's law of cooling,

$$q''_s=h(T_s-T_m),$$

and can be evaluated from the correlation

$$Nu_D = \left[ \left (3.66+{4.343\over a}\right)^3 + 1.158\left( {Re_D(D/C)^{0.5}\over b}\right)^{3\over 2}\right]^{1\over 3}  \left({\mu\over \mu_s}\right)^{0.14},$$

where

$$a=\left(1+{927(C/D)\over Re_D^2 Pr}\right)$$

and

$$b=1+{0.477\over Pr}.$$

The correlations for the friction factor in the turbulent state are based on limited data. Increased heat transfer due to the secondary flow is not significant in a turbulent state at less than 10% for $C/D \ge 20$. Furthermore, augmentation created by the use of helically coiled tubes due to the secondary flow is usually employed only for situations where the flow is in a laminar state. In this state, the entrance length is 20% to 50% shorter than in a straight tube. In the case of turbulent flow, the flow becomes fully developed during the first half-turn of the helically coiled tube. For this reason, the entrance region can be neglected in many engineering calculations. If the liquid or gas is heated in a straight tube, then the fluid that passes near the centerline will exit the tube in a much shorter time and will always be cooler than the fluid passing near the wall.
