= Sherwood number =

Dimensionless number in fluid mechanics

The Sherwood number (Sh) (also called the mass transfer Nusselt number) is a dimensionless number used in mass-transfer operation. It represents the ratio of the total mass transfer rate (convection + diffusion) to the rate of diffusive mass transport, and is named in honor of Thomas Kilgore Sherwood.

== Definition ==
It is defined as follows

$$\mathrm{Sh} = \frac{h}{D/L} = \frac{\mbox{Total mass transfer rate}}{\mbox{Diffusion rate}}$$

where

- L is a characteristic length (m)
- D is mass diffusivity (m^{2} s^{−1})
- h is the convective mass transfer film coefficient (m s^{−1})

Using dimensional analysis, it can also be further defined as a function of the Reynolds and Schmidt numbers:

$$\mathrm{Sh} = f(\mathrm{Re}, \mathrm{Sc})$$

For example, for a single sphere it can be expressed as:

$$\mathrm{Sh} = \mathrm{Sh}_0 + C\, \mathrm{Re}^{m}\, \mathrm{Sc}^{\frac{1}{3}}$$

where $\mathrm{Sh}_0$ is the Sherwood number due only to natural convection and not forced convection.

== Correlations ==
A more specific correlation is the Froessling equation:

$$\mathrm{Sh} = 2 + 0.552\, \mathrm{Re}^{\frac{1}{2}}\, \mathrm{Sc}^{\frac{1}{3}}$$

This form is applicable to molecular diffusion from a single spherical particle. It is particularly valuable in situations where the Reynolds number and Schmidt number are readily available. Since Re and Sc are both dimensionless numbers, the Sherwood number is also dimensionless.

These correlations are the mass transfer analogies to heat transfer correlations of the Nusselt number in terms of the Reynolds number and Prandtl number. For a correlation for a given geometry (e.g. spheres, plates, cylinders, etc.), a heat transfer correlation (often more readily available from literature and experimental work, and easier to determine) for the Nusselt number (Nu) in terms of the Reynolds number (Re) and the Prandtl number (Pr) can be used as a mass transfer correlation by replacing the Prandtl number with the analogous dimensionless number for mass transfer, the Schmidt number, and replacing the Nusselt number with the analogous dimensionless number for mass transfer, the Sherwood number.

== Examples ==
As an example, a heat transfer correlation for spheres is given by the Ranz-Marshall Correlation:

$$\mathrm{Nu} = 2 + 0.6\, \mathrm{Re}^{\frac{1}{2}}\, \mathrm{Pr}^{\frac{1}{3}}, ~ 0 \le ~ \mathrm{Re} <200, ~ 0 \le \mathrm{Pr} < 250$$

This correlation can be made into a mass transfer correlation using the above procedure, which yields:

$$\mathrm{Sh} = 2 + 0.6\, \mathrm{Re}^{\frac{1}{2}} \, \mathrm{Sc}^{\frac{1}{3}}, ~ 0 \le ~ \mathrm{Re} < 200, ~ 0 \le \mathrm{Sc} < 250$$

This is a very concrete way of demonstrating the analogies between different forms of transport phenomena.

== See also ==
- Churchill–Bernstein equation
