= Film temperature =

Temperature at the boundary layer of a fluid undergoing convection

In fluid thermodynamics, the film temperature (T_{f}) is an approximation of the temperature of a fluid inside a convection boundary layer. It is calculated as the arithmetic mean of the temperature at the surface of the solid boundary wall (T_{w}) and the free-stream temperature (T_{∞}):

$$T_f=\frac{T_w + T_\infty}{2}$$

The film temperature is often used as the temperature at which fluid properties are calculated when using the Prandtl number, Nusselt number, Reynolds number or Grashof number to calculate a heat transfer coefficient, because it is a reasonable first approximation to the temperature within the convection boundary layer.

Somewhat confusing terminology may be encountered in relation to boilers and heat exchangers, where the same term is used to refer to the limit (hot) temperature of a fluid in contact with a hot surface.
