= Turbulent Prandtl number =

The turbulent Prandtl number (Pr_{t}) is a non-dimensional term defined as the ratio between the momentum eddy diffusivity and the heat transfer eddy diffusivity. It is useful for solving the heat transfer problem of turbulent boundary layer flows. The simplest model for Pr_{t} is the Reynolds analogy, which yields a turbulent Prandtl number of 1. From experimental data, Pr_{t} has an average value of 0.85, but ranges from 0.7 to 0.9 depending on the Prandtl number of the fluid in question.

== Definition ==
The introduction of eddy diffusivity and subsequently the turbulent Prandtl number works as a way to define a simple relationship between the extra shear stress and heat flux that is present in turbulent flow. If the momentum and thermal eddy diffusivities are zero (no apparent turbulent shear stress and heat flux), then the turbulent flow equations reduce to the laminar equations. We can define the momentum eddy diffusivity $\varepsilon_M$ and the heat transfer eddy diffusivity $\varepsilon_H$ as:

$$-\overline{u'v'} = \varepsilon_M \frac{\partial \bar{u}}{\partial y}$$

and

$$-\overline{v'T'} = \varepsilon_H \frac{\partial \bar{T}}{\partial y}$$

where $-\rho\overline{u'v'}$ is the Reynolds stress and $-\rho c_p\overline{v'T'}$ is the turbulent heat flux. The turbulent Prandtl number is then defined as:$\mathrm{Pr}_\mathrm{t} = \frac{\varepsilon_M}{\varepsilon_H}.$

The turbulent Prandtl number has been shown to not generally equal unity (e.g. Malhotra and Kang, 1984; Kays, 1994; McEligot and Taylor, 1996; and Churchill, 2002). It is a strong function of the molecular Prandtl number amongst other parameters and the Reynolds Analogy is not applicable when the molecular Prandtl number differs significantly from unity as determined by Malhotra and Kang; and elaborated by McEligot and Taylor and Churchill

== Application ==
The turbulent momentum boundary layer equation is:

$$\bar {u} \frac{\partial \bar{u}}{\partial x} + \bar {v} \frac{\partial \bar{u}}{\partial y} = -\frac{1}{\rho} \frac{d\bar{P}}{dx} + \frac{\partial}{\partial y} \left [(\nu + \varepsilon_M) \frac{\partial \bar{u}}{\partial y}\right]$$

The turbulent thermal boundary layer equation is:

$$\bar {u} \frac{\partial \bar{T}}{\partial x} + \bar {v} \frac{\partial \bar{T}}{\partial y} = \frac{\partial}{\partial y} \left [(\alpha + \varepsilon_H) \frac{\partial \bar{T}}{\partial y}\right]$$

Substituting the definition of the turbulent Prandtl number into the thermal equation yields:

$$\bar {u} \frac{\partial \bar{T}}{\partial x} + \bar {v} \frac{\partial \bar{T}}{\partial y} = \frac{\partial}{\partial y} \left [ \left( \alpha + \frac{\varepsilon_M}{\mathrm{Pr}_\mathrm{t}} \right) \frac{\partial \bar{T}}{\partial y} \right].$$

== Consequences ==
In the special case where the Prandtl number and turbulent Prandtl number both equal unity (as in the Reynolds analogy), the velocity profile and temperature profiles are identical. This greatly simplifies the solution of the heat transfer problem. If the Prandtl number and turbulent Prandtl number are different from unity, then a solution is possible by knowing the turbulent Prandtl number so that one can still solve the momentum and thermal equations. Interactive calculators are often used to determine these dimensionless ratios for various fluids and flow conditions.

In a general case of three-dimensional turbulence, the concept of eddy viscosity and eddy diffusivity are not valid. Consequently, the turbulent Prandtl number has no meaning.

== Books ==
- Kays, William; Crawford, M.; Weigand, B. (2005). Convective Heat and Mass Transfer, Fourth Edition. McGraw-Hill. ISBN 978-0-07-246876-2.
