= Mass transfer =

Net movement of mass from one location, phase, etc. to another

Mass transfer is the net movement of mass from one location (usually meaning stream, phase, fraction, or component) to another. Mass transfer occurs in many processes, such as absorption, evaporation, drying, precipitation, membrane filtration, and distillation. Mass transfer is used by different scientific disciplines for different processes and mechanisms. The phrase is commonly used in engineering for physical processes that involve diffusive and convective transport of chemical species within physical systems.

Some common examples of mass transfer processes are the evaporation of water from a pond to the atmosphere, the purification of blood in the kidneys and liver, and the distillation of alcohol. In industrial processes, mass transfer operations include separation of chemical components in distillation columns, absorbers such as scrubbers or stripping, adsorbers such as activated carbon beds, and liquid-liquid extraction. Mass transfer is often coupled to additional transport processes, for instance in industrial cooling towers. These towers couple heat transfer to mass transfer by allowing hot water to flow in contact with air. The water is cooled by expelling some of its content in the form of water vapour.

== Astrophysics ==
In astrophysics, mass transfer is the process by which matter gravitationally bound to a body, usually a star, fills its Roche lobe and becomes gravitationally bound to a second body, usually a compact object (white dwarf, neutron star or black hole), and is eventually accreted onto it. It is a common phenomenon in binary systems, and may play an important role in some types of supernovae and pulsars.

Mass transfer in binary systems can also take place via the stellar wind, which is known as "wind mass transfer". It is often modeled theoretically as Bondi–Hoyle–Lyttleton accretion.

== Chemical engineering ==
Mass transfer finds extensive application in chemical engineering problems. It is used in reaction engineering, separations engineering, heat transfer engineering, and many other sub-disciplines of chemical engineering like electrochemical engineering.

The driving force for mass transfer is usually a difference in chemical potential, when it can be defined, though other thermodynamic gradients may couple to the flow of mass and drive it as well. A chemical species moves from areas of high chemical potential to areas of low chemical potential. Thus, the maximum theoretical extent of a given mass transfer is typically determined by the point at which the chemical potential is uniform. For single phase-systems, this usually translates to uniform concentration throughout the phase, while for multiphase systems chemical species will often prefer one phase over the others and reach a uniform chemical potential only when most of the chemical species has been absorbed into the preferred phase, as in liquid-liquid extraction.

While thermodynamic equilibrium determines the theoretical extent of a given mass transfer operation, the actual rate of mass transfer will depend on additional factors including the flow patterns within the system and the diffusivities of the species in each phase. This rate can be quantified through the calculation and application of mass transfer coefficients for an overall process. These mass transfer coefficients are typically published in terms of dimensionless numbers, often including Péclet numbers, Reynolds numbers, Sherwood numbers, and Schmidt numbers, among others.

== Analogies between heat, mass, and momentum transfer ==
There are notable similarities in the commonly used approximate differential equations for momentum, heat, and mass transfer. The molecular transfer equations of Newton's law for fluid momentum at low Reynolds number (Stokes flow), Fourier's law for heat, and Fick's law for mass are very similar, since they are all linear approximations to transport of conserved quantities in a flow field. At higher Reynolds number, the analogy between mass and heat transfer and momentum transfer becomes less useful due to the nonlinearity of the Navier–Stokes equation (or more fundamentally, the general momentum conservation equation), but the analogy between heat and mass transfer remains good. A great deal of effort has been devoted to developing analogies among these three transport processes so as to allow prediction of one from any of the others.

== See also ==
- Crystal growth
- Heat transfer
- Fick's laws of diffusion
- Fractionating column
- McCabe–Thiele method
- Vapor–liquid equilibrium
- Liquid–liquid extraction
- Separation process
- Binary star
- Type Ia supernova
- Thermodiffusion
- Accretion (astrophysics)
