= Heat transfer coefficient =

Quantity relating heat flux and temperature difference

Graph showing how heat transfer decreases as insulation thickness increases.

In thermodynamics, the heat transfer coefficient or film coefficient, or film effectiveness, is the proportionality constant between the heat flux and the thermodynamic driving force for the flow of heat (i.e., the temperature difference, ΔT ). It is used to calculate heat transfer between components of a system; such as by convection between a fluid and a solid. The heat transfer coefficient has SI units in watts per square meter kelvin (W/(m^{2}K)).

The total heat transfer rate for combined modes and system components is usually expressed in terms of an overall heat transfer coefficient, thermal transmittance or U-value. The heat transfer coefficient is the reciprocal of thermal insulance. This is used for building materials (R-value) and for clothing insulation.

There are numerous methods for calculating the heat transfer coefficient in different heat transfer modes, different fluids, flow regimes, and under different thermohydraulic conditions. Often it can be estimated by dividing the thermal conductivity of the convection fluid by a length scale. The heat transfer coefficient is often calculated from the Nusselt number (a dimensionless number). There are also online calculators available specifically for Heat-transfer fluid applications. Experimental assessment of the heat transfer coefficient poses some challenges especially when small fluxes are to be measured (e.g. < 0.2 W/cm^{2}).

== Definition ==
The general definition of the heat transfer coefficient is:

$$h = \frac{q}{\Delta T}$$

where:

$q$: heat flux (W/m^{2}); i.e., thermal power per unit area, $q = d\dot{Q}/dA$
$\Delta T$: difference in temperature (K) between the solid surface and surrounding fluid area

The heat transfer coefficient replaces the thermal conductivity within a generalization of Fourier's law postulated to also describe convection flows (including conduction). Upon reaching a steady state of flow, the heat transfer rate is:

$$\dot{Q}=hA(T_2-T_1)$$

where (in SI units):

$\dot{Q}$: Heat transfer rate (W)
$h$: Heat transfer coefficient (W/m^{2}K)
$A$: surface area where the heat transfer takes place (m^{2})
$T_2$: temperature of the surrounding fluid (K)
$T_1$: temperature of the solid surface (K)

In much practical application, a heat transfer coefficient has a relatively constant value over its specified temperature range of usefulness.

== Composition ==
A simple method for determining an overall heat transfer coefficient that is useful to find the heat transfer through a sequence of simple elements such as walls in buildings or across heat exchangers is shown below. This method most readily accounts for conduction and convection. Effects of radiation can be similarly estimated, but introduce non-linear temperature dependence. The method is as follows:

$$\frac{1}{U \cdot A} = \frac{1}{h_1 \cdot A_1} + \frac{dx_w}{k \cdot A} + \frac{1}{h_2 \cdot A_2}$$

Where:

$U$ = the overall heat transfer coefficient (W/(m^{2}·K))
$A$ = the contact area for each fluid side (m^{2}) (with $A_{1}$ and $A_{2}$ expressing either surface)
$k$ = the thermal conductivity of the material (W/(m·K))
$h$ = the individual convection heat transfer coefficient for each fluid (W/(m^{2}·K))
$dx_w$ = the wall thickness (m).

As the areas for each surface approach being equal the equation can be written as the transfer coefficient per unit area as shown below:

$$\frac{1}{U} = \frac{1}{h_1} + \frac{dx_w}{k} + \frac{1}{h_2}$$

or

$$U = \frac{1}{\frac{1}{h_1} + \frac{dx_w}{k} + \frac{1}{h_2}}$$

Often the value for $dx_w$ is referred to as the difference of two radii where the inner and outer radii are used to define the thickness of a pipe carrying a fluid, however, this figure may also be considered as a wall thickness in a flat plate transfer mechanism or other common flat surfaces such as a wall in a building when the area difference between each edge of the transmission surface approaches zero.

In the walls of buildings the above formula can be used to derive the formula commonly used to calculate the heat through building components. Architects and engineers call the resulting values either the U-Value or the R-Value of a construction assembly like a wall. Each type of value (R or U) are related as the inverse of each other such that R-Value = 1/U-Value and both are more fully understood through the concept of an overall heat transfer coefficient described in lower section of this document.

== Convective heat transfer correlations ==
Although convective heat transfer can be derived analytically through dimensional analysis, exact analysis of the boundary layer, approximate integral analysis of the boundary layer and analogies between energy and momentum transfer, these analytic approaches may not offer practical solutions to all problems when there are no mathematical models applicable. Therefore, many correlations were developed by various authors to estimate the convective heat transfer coefficient in various cases including natural convection, forced convection for internal flow and forced convection for external flow. These empirical correlations are presented for their particular geometry and flow conditions. As the fluid properties are temperature dependent, they are evaluated at the film temperature $T_f$, which is the average of the surface $T_s$ and the surrounding bulk temperature, ${{T}_{\infty }}$.

$${{T}_{f}}=\frac{{{T}_{s}}+{{T}_{\infty }}}{2}$$

=== External flow, vertical plane ===
Recommendations by Churchill and Chu provide the following correlation for natural convection adjacent to a vertical plane, both for laminar and turbulent flow. k is the thermal conductivity of the fluid, L is the characteristic length with respect to the direction of gravity, Ra_{L} is the Rayleigh number with respect to this length and Pr is the Prandtl number (the Rayleigh number can be written as the product of the Grashof number and the Prandtl number).

$$h \ = \frac{k}{L}\left({0.825 + \frac{0.387 \mathrm{Ra}_L^{1/6}}{\left(1 + (0.492/\mathrm{Pr})^{9/16} \right)^{8/27} }}\right)^2 \, \quad \mathrm{Ra}_L < 10^{12}$$

For laminar flows, the following correlation is slightly more accurate. It is observed that a transition from a laminar to a turbulent boundary occurs when Ra_{L} exceeds around 10^{9}.

$$h \ = \frac{k}{L} \left(0.68 + \frac{0.67 \mathrm{Ra}_L^{1/4}}{\left(1 + (0.492/\mathrm{Pr})^{9/16}\right)^{4/9}}\right) \, \quad \mathrm10^{-1} < \mathrm{Ra}_L < 10^9$$

=== External flow, vertical cylinders ===
For cylinders with their axes vertical, the expressions for plane surfaces can be used provided the curvature effect is not too significant. This represents the limit where boundary layer thickness is small relative to cylinder diameter $D$. For fluids with Pr ≤ 0.72, the correlations for vertical plane walls can be used when

$$\frac{D}{L}\ge \frac{35}{\mathrm{Gr}_{L}^{\frac{1}{4}}}$$

where $\mathrm{Gr}_L$ is the Grashof number.

And in fluids of Pr ≤ 6 when

$$\frac{D}{L}\ge \frac{25.1}{\mathrm{Gr}_{L}^{\frac{1}{4}}}$$

Under these circumstances, the error is limited to up to 5.5%.

=== External flow, horizontal plates ===
W. H. McAdams suggested the following correlations for horizontal plates. The induced buoyancy will be different depending upon whether the hot surface is facing up or down.

For a hot surface facing up, or a cold surface facing down, for laminar flow:

$$h \ = \frac{k 0.54 \mathrm{Ra}_L^{1/4}} {L} \, \quad 10^5 < \mathrm{Ra}_L < 2\times 10^7$$

and for turbulent flow:

$$h \ = \frac{k 0.14 \mathrm{Ra}_L^{1/3}} {L} \, \quad 2\times 10^7 < \mathrm{Ra}_L < 3\times 10^{10} .$$

For a hot surface facing down, or a cold surface facing up, for laminar flow:

$$h \ = \frac{k 0.27 \mathrm{Ra}_L^{1/4}} {L} \, \quad 3\times 10^5 < \mathrm{Ra}_L < 3\times 10^{10}.$$

The characteristic length is the ratio of the plate surface area to perimeter. If the surface is inclined at an angle θ with the vertical then the equations for a vertical plate by Churchill and Chu may be used for θ up to 60°; if the boundary layer flow is laminar, the gravitational constant g is replaced with g cos θ when calculating the Ra term.

=== External flow, horizontal cylinder ===
For cylinders of sufficient length and negligible end effects, Churchill and Chu has the following correlation for $10^{-5}<\mathrm{Ra}_D<10^{12}$.

$$h \ =  \frac{k} {D}\left({0.6 + \frac{0.387 \mathrm{Ra}_D^{1/6}}{\left(1 + (0.559/\mathrm{Pr})^{9/16} \, \right)^{8/27} \,}}\right)^2$$

=== External flow, spheres ===
For spheres, T. Yuge has the following correlation for Pr≃1 and $1 \le \mathrm{Ra}_D \le 10^5$.

$${\mathrm{Nu}}_D \ = 2 + 0.43 \mathrm{Ra}_D^{1/4}$$

=== Vertical rectangular enclosure ===
For heat flow between two opposing vertical plates of rectangular enclosures, Catton recommends the following two correlations for smaller aspect ratios. The correlations are valid for any value of Prandtl number.

For $1 <\frac{H}{L} < 2$ :

$$h \ = \frac{k}{L}0.18 \left(\frac{\mathrm{Pr}}{0.2 + \mathrm{Pr}} \mathrm{Ra}_L \right)^{0.29} \, \quad \mathrm{Ra}_L \mathrm{Pr}/(0.2 + \mathrm{Pr}) > 10^3$$

where H is the internal height of the enclosure and L is the horizontal distance between the two sides of different temperatures.

For $2 < \frac{H}{L} < 10$ :

$$h \ = \frac{k}{L}0.22 \left(\frac{\mathrm{Pr}}{0.2 + \mathrm{Pr}} \mathrm{Ra}_L \right)^{0.28} \left(\frac{H}{L} \right)^{-1/4} \, \quad \mathrm{Ra}_L < 10^{10}.$$

For vertical enclosures with larger aspect ratios, the following two correlations can be used. For 10 < H/L < 40:

$$h \ = \frac{k}{L}0.42 \mathrm{Ra}_L^{1/4} \mathrm{Pr}^{0.012} \left(\frac{H}{L} \right)^{-0.3} \, \quad 1 < \mathrm{Pr} < 2\times10^4, \, \quad 10^4 < \mathrm{Ra}_L < 10^7.$$

For $1 < \frac{H}{L} < 40$ :

$$h \ = \frac{k}{L}0.46 \mathrm{Ra}_L^{1/3} \, \quad 1 < \mathrm{Pr} < 20, \, \quad 10^6 < \mathrm{Ra}_L < 10^9.$$

For all four correlations, fluid properties are evaluated at the average temperature—as opposed to film temperature—$(T_1+T_2)/2$, where $T_1$ and $T_2$ are the temperatures of the vertical surfaces and $T_1 > T_2$.

=== Forced convection ===
See main article Nusselt number and Churchill–Bernstein equation for forced convection over a horizontal cylinder.

==== Internal flow, laminar flow ====
Sieder and Tate give the following correlation to account for entrance effects in laminar flow in tubes where $D$ is the internal diameter, ${\mu }_{b}$ is the fluid viscosity at the bulk mean temperature, ${\mu }_{w}$ is the viscosity at the tube wall surface temperature.

$$\mathrm{Nu}_{D}={1.86}\cdot{{{\left( \mathrm{Re}\cdot\mathrm{Pr} \right)}^{{}^{1}\!\!\diagup\!\!{}_{3}\;}}}{{\left( \frac{D}{L} \right)}^{{}^{1}\!\!\diagup\!\!{}_{3}\;}}{{\left( \frac{{{\mu }_{b}}}{{{\mu }_{w}}} \right)}^{0.14}}$$

For fully developed laminar flow, the Nusselt number is constant and equal to 3.66. Mills combines the entrance effects and fully developed flow into one equation

$\mathrm{Nu}_{D}=3.66+\frac{0.065\cdot\mathrm{Re}\cdot\mathrm{Pr}\cdot\frac{D}{L}}{1+0.04\cdot\left( \mathrm{Re}\cdot\mathrm{Pr}\cdot\frac{D}{L}\right)^{2/3}}$

==== Internal flow, turbulent flow ====
The Dittus-Bölter correlation (1930) is a common and particularly simple correlation useful for many applications. This correlation is applicable when forced convection is the only mode of heat transfer; i.e., there is no boiling, condensation, significant radiation, etc. The accuracy of this correlation is anticipated to be ±15%.

For a fluid flowing in a straight circular pipe with a Reynolds number between 10,000 and 120,000 (in the turbulent pipe flow range), when the fluid's Prandtl number is between 0.7 and 120, for a location far from the pipe entrance (more than 10 pipe diameters; more than 50 diameters according to many authors) or other flow disturbances, and when the pipe surface is hydraulically smooth, the heat transfer coefficient between the bulk of the fluid and the pipe surface can be expressed explicitly as:

$${h d \over k}= {0.023} \, \left({j d \over \mu}\right)^{0.8} \, \left({\mu c_p \over k}\right)^n$$

where:

$d$ is the hydraulic diameter
$k$ is the thermal conductivity of the bulk fluid
$\mu$ is the fluid viscosity
$j$ is the mass flux
$c_p$ is the isobaric heat capacity of the fluid
$n$ is 0.4 for heating (wall hotter than the bulk fluid) and 0.33 for cooling (wall cooler than the bulk fluid).

The fluid properties necessary for the application of this equation are evaluated at the bulk temperature thus avoiding iteration.

==== Forced convection, external flow ====
In analyzing the heat transfer associated with the flow past the exterior surface of a solid, the situation is complicated by phenomena such as boundary layer separation. Various authors have correlated charts and graphs for different geometries and flow conditions. For flow parallel to a plane surface, where $x$ is the distance from the edge and $L$ is the height of the boundary layer, a mean Nusselt number can be calculated using the Colburn analogy.

== Thom correlation ==
There exist simple fluid-specific correlations for heat transfer coefficient in boiling. The Thom correlation is for the flow of boiling water (subcooled or saturated at pressures up to about 20 MPa) under conditions where the nucleate boiling contribution predominates over forced convection. This correlation is useful for rough estimation of expected temperature difference given the heat flux:

$\Delta T_{\rm sat} = 22.5 \cdot {q}^{0.5} \exp (-P/8.7)$

where:

$\Delta T_{\rm sat}$ is the wall temperature elevation above the saturation temperature, K
q is the heat flux, MW/m^{2}
P is the pressure of water, MPa

This empirical correlation is specific to the units given.

== Heat transfer coefficient of pipe wall ==
The resistance to the flow of heat by the material of pipe wall can be expressed as a "heat transfer coefficient of the pipe wall". However, one needs to select if the heat flux is based on the pipe inner or the outer diameter. If the heat flux is based on the inner diameter of the pipe, and if the pipe wall is thin compared to this diameter, the curvature of the wall has a negligible effect on heat transfer. In this case, the pipe wall can be approximated as a flat plane, which simplifies calculations. This assumption allows the heat transfer coefficient for the pipe wall to be calculated as:

$$h_{\rm wall} = {2 k \over x}$$

where

$k$ is the effective thermal conductivity of the wall material
$x$ is the difference between the outer and inner diameter.

However, when the wall thickness is significant enough that curvature cannot be ignored, the heat transfer coefficient needs to account for the cylindrical shape. Under this condition, the heat transfer coefficient can be more accurately calculated using :

$$h_{\rm wall}  = {2k \over {d_{\rm i}\ln(d_{\rm o}/d_{\rm i})}}$$

where

$d_i$ = inner diameter of the pipe [m]
$d_o$ = outer diameter of the pipe [m]

The thermal conductivity of the tube material usually depends on temperature; the mean thermal conductivity is often used.

== Combining convective heat transfer coefficients ==
For two or more heat transfer processes acting in parallel, convective heat transfer coefficients simply add:

$$h = h_1 + h_2 + \cdots$$

For two or more heat transfer processes connected in series, convective heat transfer coefficients add inversely:

$${1\over h} = {1\over h_1} + {1\over h_2} + \dots$$

For example, consider a pipe with a fluid flowing inside. The approximate rate of heat transfer between the bulk of the fluid inside the pipe and the pipe external surface is:

$$q=\left( {1\over{{1 \over h}+{t \over k}}} \right) \cdot A \cdot \Delta T$$

where

$q$ = heat transfer rate (W)
$h$ = convective heat transfer coefficient (W/(m^{2}·K))
$t$ = wall thickness (m)
$k$ = wall thermal conductivity (W/m·K)
$A$ = area (m^{2})
$\Delta T$ = difference in temperature (K)

== Overall heat transfer coefficient ==
The overall heat transfer coefficient $U$ is a measure of the overall ability of a series of conductive and convective barriers to transfer heat. It is commonly applied to the calculation of heat transfer in heat exchangers, but can be applied equally well to other problems.

For the case of a heat exchanger, $U$ can be used to determine the total heat transfer between the two streams in the heat exchanger by the following relationship:

$$q = UA \Delta T_{LM}$$

where:

$q$ = heat transfer rate (W)
$U$ = overall heat transfer coefficient (W/(m^{2}·K))
$A$ = heat transfer surface area (m^{2})
$\Delta T_{LM}$ = logarithmic mean temperature difference (K).

The overall heat transfer coefficient takes into account the individual heat transfer coefficients of each stream and the resistance of the pipe material. It can be calculated as the reciprocal of the sum of a series of thermal resistances (but more complex relationships exist, for example when heat transfer takes place by different routes in parallel):

$$\frac {1} {UA} = \sum \frac{1} {hA} + \sum R$$

where:

R = Resistance(s) to heat flow in pipe wall (K/W)
Other parameters are as above.

The heat transfer coefficient is the heat transferred per unit area per kelvin. Thus area is included in the equation as it represents the area over which the transfer of heat takes place. The areas for each flow will be different as they represent the contact area for each fluid side.

The thermal resistance due to the pipe wall (for thin walls) is calculated by the following relationship:

$$R = \frac{x}{kA}$$

where

$x$ = the wall thickness (m)
$k$ = the thermal conductivity of the material (W/(m·K))

This represents the heat transfer by conduction in the pipe.

The thermal conductivity is a characteristic of the particular material. Values of thermal conductivities for various materials are listed in the list of thermal conductivities.

As mentioned earlier in the article the convection heat transfer coefficient for each stream depends on the type of fluid, flow properties and temperature properties.

Some typical heat transfer coefficients include:

- Air - h = 10 to 100 W/(m^{2}K)
- Water - h = 500 to 10,000 W/(m^{2}K).

== Thermal resistance due to fouling deposits ==
Often during their use, heat exchangers collect a layer of fouling on the surface which, in addition to potentially contaminating a stream, reduces the effectiveness of heat exchangers. In a fouled heat exchanger the buildup on the walls creates an additional layer of materials that heat must flow through. Due to this new layer, there is additional resistance within the heat exchanger and thus the overall heat transfer coefficient of the exchanger is reduced. The following relationship is used to solve for the heat transfer resistance with the additional fouling resistance:

$\frac{1}{U_{f}P}$ = $\frac{1}{UP}+\frac{R_{fH}}{P_{H}}+\frac{R_{fC}}{P_{C}}$

where

$U_{f}$ = overall heat transfer coefficient for a fouled heat exchanger, $\textstyle \rm \frac{W}{m^2K}$
$P$= perimeter of the heat exchanger, may be either the hot or cold side perimeter however, it must be the same perimeter on both sides of the equation, $\rm m$
$U$ = overall heat transfer coefficient for an unfouled heat exchanger, $\textstyle \rm \frac{W}{m^2K}$
$R_{fC}$ = fouling resistance on the cold side of the heat exchanger, $\textstyle \rm \frac{m^2K}{W}$
$R_{fH}$ = fouling resistance on the hot side of the heat exchanger, $\textstyle \rm \frac{m^2K}{W}$
$P_C$ = perimeter of the cold side of the heat exchanger, $\rm m$
$P_H$ = perimeter of the hot side of the heat exchanger, $\rm m$

This equation uses the overall heat transfer coefficient of an unfouled heat exchanger and the fouling resistance to calculate the overall heat transfer coefficient of a fouled heat exchanger. The equation takes into account that the perimeter of the heat exchanger is different on the hot and cold sides. The perimeter used for the $P$ does not matter as long as it is the same. The overall heat transfer coefficients will adjust to take into account that a different perimeter was used as the product $UP$ will remain the same.

The fouling resistances can be calculated for a specific heat exchanger if the average thickness and thermal conductivity of the fouling are known. The product of the average thickness and thermal conductivity will result in the fouling resistance on a specific side of the heat exchanger.

$R_f$ = $\frac{d_f}{k_f}$

where:

$d_f$ = average thickness of the fouling in a heat exchanger, $\rm m$
$k_f$ = thermal conductivity of the fouling, $\textstyle \rm \frac{W}{mK}$.

== See also ==
- Convective heat transfer
- Heat sink
- Convection
- Churchill–Bernstein equation
- Heat
- Heat pump
- Heisler Chart
- Thermal conductivity
- Thermal-hydraulics
- Biot number
- Fourier number
- Nusselt number
