= Schmidt number =

Ratio of a fluid's kinematic viscosity to mass diffusivity

In fluid dynamics, the Schmidt number (denoted Sc) of a fluid is a dimensionless number defined as the ratio of momentum diffusivity (kinematic viscosity) and mass diffusivity, and it is used to characterize fluid flows in which there are simultaneous momentum and mass diffusion convection processes. It was named after German engineer Ernst Heinrich Wilhelm Schmidt (1892–1975).

The Schmidt number is the ratio of the shear component for diffusivity (viscosity divided by density) to the diffusivity for mass transfer D. It physically relates the relative thickness of the hydrodynamic layer and mass-transfer boundary layer.

It is defined as:

$$\mathrm{Sc} = \frac{\nu}{D} = \frac {\mu} {\rho D} = \frac{ \mbox{viscous diffusion rate} }{ \mbox{(molecular) mass diffusion rate} } = \frac{\mathrm{Pe}}{\mathrm{Re}}$$

where (in SI units):

- $\nu = \tfrac \mu \rho$ is the kinematic viscosity (m^{2}/s)
- D is the mass diffusivity (m^{2}/s).
- μ is the dynamic viscosity of the fluid (Pa·s = N·s/m^{2} = kg/m·s)
- ρ is the density of the fluid (kg/m^{3})
- Pe is the Peclet Number
- Re is the Reynolds Number.

The heat transfer analog of the Schmidt number is the Prandtl number (Pr). The ratio of thermal diffusivity to mass diffusivity is the Lewis number (Le).

== Turbulent Schmidt Number ==
The turbulent Schmidt number is commonly used in turbulence research and is defined as:

$$\mathrm{Sc}_\mathrm{t} = \frac{\nu_\mathrm{t}}{K}$$

where:

- $\nu_\mathrm{t}$ is the eddy viscosity in units of (m^{2}/s)
- $K$ is the mass diffusivity (m^{2}/s).

The turbulent Schmidt number describes the ratio between the rates of turbulent transport of momentum and the turbulent transport of mass (or any passive scalar). It is related to the turbulent Prandtl number, which is concerned with turbulent heat transfer rather than turbulent mass transfer. It is useful for solving the mass transfer problem of turbulent boundary layer flows. The simplest model for Sct is the Reynolds analogy, which yields a turbulent Schmidt number of 1. From experimental data and CFD simulations, Sct ranges from 0.2 to 6. Studies have shown that the turbulent Schmidt number varies locally within a flow, depending on both turbulence characteristics and flow parameters. Formulations have been derived to estimate it locally based on these quantities, providing a means to relate concentration and turbulence fields more directly.

A local formulation proposed in 2020 within a multi-fidelity framework relates the turbulent Schmidt number to the molecular Schmidt number $\mathrm{Sc}$, the turbulent Reynolds number $\mathrm{Re}_t$, and dimensionless invariants associated with the strain-rate and rotation tensors:

$$\log(\mathrm{Sc}_t)
=
a\,\mathrm{Sc}
+
b\,\mathrm{Re}_t^{0.01}
+
c\,I_S
+
d\,I_\Omega$$

where $a$, $b$, $c$, and $d$ are coefficients determined from reference data, and

$$I_S =
\frac{k}{\varepsilon}
\sqrt{2S_{ij}S_{ij}},
\qquad
I_\Omega =
\frac{k}{\varepsilon}
\sqrt{2\Omega_{ij}\Omega_{ij}}$$

are dimensionless invariants of the strain-rate and rotation tensors, respectively.

== Stirling engines ==
For Stirling engines, the Schmidt number is related to the specific power. Gustav Schmidt of the German Polytechnic Institute of Prague published an analysis in 1871 for the now-famous closed-form solution for an idealized isothermal Stirling engine model.

$$\mathrm{Sc} = \frac{\sum {\left | {Q} \right |}}{\bar p V_{sw}}$$

where:

- $\mathrm{Sc}$ is the Schmidt number
- $Q$ is the heat transferred into the working fluid
- $\bar p$ is the mean pressure of the working fluid
- $V_{sw}$ is the volume swept by the piston.
