= Thermal fluids =

Branch of science and engineering

Thermal fluids, or thermofluids, is a branch of science and engineering encompassing four intersecting fields: heat transfer, thermodynamics, fluid mechanics, and combustion. It is the study of how energy interacts with liquids, gases and vapors in different conditions.

The term is a combination of "thermo", referring to heat, and "fluids", which refers to liquids, gases and vapors. Temperature, pressure, equations of state, and transport laws all play an important role in thermofluid problems. Phase transition and chemical reactions may also be important in a thermofluid context.
