= Prandtl number =

Ratio of kinematic viscosity to thermal diffusivity

The Prandtl number (Pr) is a dimensionless number, named for the German fluid dynamicist Ludwig Prandtl. It is defined as the ratio of momentum diffusivity to thermal diffusivity. The Prandtl number is a ratio of physical properties that may be arranged in several ways

$$\mathrm{Pr} = \frac{\nu}{\alpha} = \frac{\mbox{momentum diffusivity}}{\mbox{thermal diffusivity}} = \frac{\mu / \rho}{k / (c_p \rho)} = \frac{c_p \mu}{k}$$

where the symbols are as follows:

- $\nu$ : kinematic viscosity (momentum diffusivity), $\nu = \mu/\rho$ [m^{2}/s]
- $\alpha$ : thermal diffusivity, $\alpha = k/(\rho c_p)$ [m^{2}/s]
- $\mu$ : dynamic viscosity [Pa s = N s/m^{2}]
- $k$ : thermal conductivity [W/(m·K)]
- $c_p$ : specific heat [J/(kg·K)]
- $\rho$ : density [kg/m^{3}].

The Prandtl number is a property of the fluid. Unlike the Reynolds number and Grashof number, it does not change with length scale or other conditions of the flow field.

The mass transfer analog of the Prandtl number is the Schmidt number. The ratio of the Schmidt number to the Prandtl number is called the Lewis number.

== Experimental values ==
The Prandtl number is often given in fluid property tables alongside other properties such as viscosity and thermal conductivity.

For most gases, Pr is approximately constant over a wide range of temperature and pressure. For monatomic gases, kinetic theory predicts Pr = 2/3, in close agreement with measurements. For polyatomic gases, Eucken's formula provides an estimate

$$\textrm{Pr} = \frac{4\gamma}{9\gamma-5}$$

where $\gamma$ is the specific heat capacity ratio of the gas.

For liquids, the Prandtl number generally drops sharply as temperature rises. Liquids composed of large, complex liquid molecules usually have a higher Pr than liquids with smaller molecules.

Some representative values of Pr are as follows:

Liquid metals

- lead at 1000 K: 0.00013
- mercury at 300 K: 0.00018
- NaK (eutectic mixture of sodium and potassium) at 400 °C: 0.00028
- potassium at 975 K: Pr = 0.003

Gases

- hydrogen (100 to 1000 K): Pr = 0.68
- monatomic gases, such as helium and argon (negligible temperature dependence): Pr = 2/3
- nitrogen and oxygen at temperatures below 1000 K: Pr varies between 0.71 and 0.76
- air, which is primarily nitrogen and oxygen (250 to 1000 K): Pr between 0.70 and 0.73
- HCFC-22 (R-22) vapor at 300 K: Pr = 0.977
- water vapor at 300 K: Pr = 1.02
- ammonia vapor at 300 K: Pr = 1.12

Liquids

- ammonia liquid at 300 K: Pr = 1.29
- HCFC-22 (R-22) liquid at 300 K: Pr = 2.48
- water: Pr = 10.6 (280 K), 5.9 (300 K), 2.0 (360 K)
- methanol (300 K): 6.7
- n-butanol: Pr = 50
- glycerol (30 °C): 5,160
- polymer melts: Pr = 10,000
- engine oil: Pr between 100 and 40,000

=== Correlations for the Prandtl number of air and water ===
For air with a pressure of 1 bar, the Prandtl numbers in the temperature range between −100 °C and +500 °C can be calculated using the formula given below. The temperature is to be used in the unit degree Celsius. The deviations are a maximum of 0.1% from the literature values.

$$\mathrm{Pr}_\text{air} = \frac{10^9}{1.1 \cdot \vartheta^3-1200 \cdot \vartheta^2 + 322000 \cdot \vartheta + 1.393 \cdot 10^9}$$,

where $\vartheta$ is the temperature in Celsius.

The Prandtl numbers for water (1 bar) can be determined in the temperature range between 0 °C and 90 °C using the formula given below. The temperature is to be used in the unit degree Celsius. The deviations are a maximum of 1% from the literature values.

$$\mathrm{Pr}_\text{water} = \frac{50000}{\vartheta^2+155\cdot \vartheta + 3700}$$

=== Application to property measurement ===
Because Pr is approximately constant for gases, it can be used to estimate the thermal conductivity of gases at high temperatures, which is otherwise difficult to measure experimentally due to the formation of convection currents.

== Physical interpretation ==
The Prandtl number describes the relative growth rates of the momentum boundary layer and the thermal boundary layer. For small values of the Prandtl number, Pr < 1, the thermal diffusivity is larger than the momentum diffusivity, and the thermal boundary layer thickness increases more rapidly than the momentum boundary layer thickness. For large values, Pr > 1, the momentum boundary thickness increases more rapidly.

For example, liquid mercury has a high thermal conductivity and low Prandtl number (Pr = 0.015). Heat diffuses much more readily than momentum, so the thermal boundary layer is thick. However, engine oil has a high viscosity and low thermal conductivity, so that momentum diffuses more readily. The Prandtl numbers of gases are about 1, which indicates that momentum and heat diffuse at about the same rate.

In a laminar boundary layer on a flat plate, the ratio of the thermal to momentum boundary layer thickness is well approximated by

$$\frac{\delta_t}{\delta} = \mathrm{Pr}^{-\frac13}, \quad 0.6 \leq \mathrm{Pr} \leq 50,$$

where $\delta_t$ is the thermal boundary layer thickness and $\delta$ is the momentum boundary layer thickness. At low Prandtl number, however,

$$\frac{\delta_t}{\delta} = \mathrm{Pr}^{-\frac12} , \quad \mathrm{Pr} \ll 1$$.

The exponent changes with the value of Prandtl number.

The different boundary layer behavior results in different expressions for the Nusselt number for laminar, incompressible flow over a flat plate in different ranges of Prandtl number:

$$\mathrm{Nu}_x = 0.339 \mathrm{Re}_x^{\frac12} \mathrm{Pr}^{\frac13}, \quad \mathrm{Pr} \to \infty,$$
$$\mathrm{Nu}_x = 0.565 \mathrm{Re}_x^{\frac12} \mathrm{Pr}^{\frac12}, \quad \mathrm{Pr} \to 0,$$

where $\mathrm{Re}_x$ is the Reynolds number. These two asymptotic solutions can be combined over the whole range of Pr with a blending formula:

$$\mathrm{Nu}_x = \frac{0.3387 \mathrm{Re}_x^{\frac12} \mathrm{Pr}^{\frac13}}{\left( 1 + \left( \frac{0.0468}\mathrm{Pr} \right)^{\frac23} \right)^{\frac14}}, \quad \mathrm{Re} \mathrm{Pr} > 100.$$

== See also ==
- Turbulent Prandtl number
- Magnetic Prandtl number
