= Johann Gottlob Leidenfrost =

German physician and theologian (1715–1794)

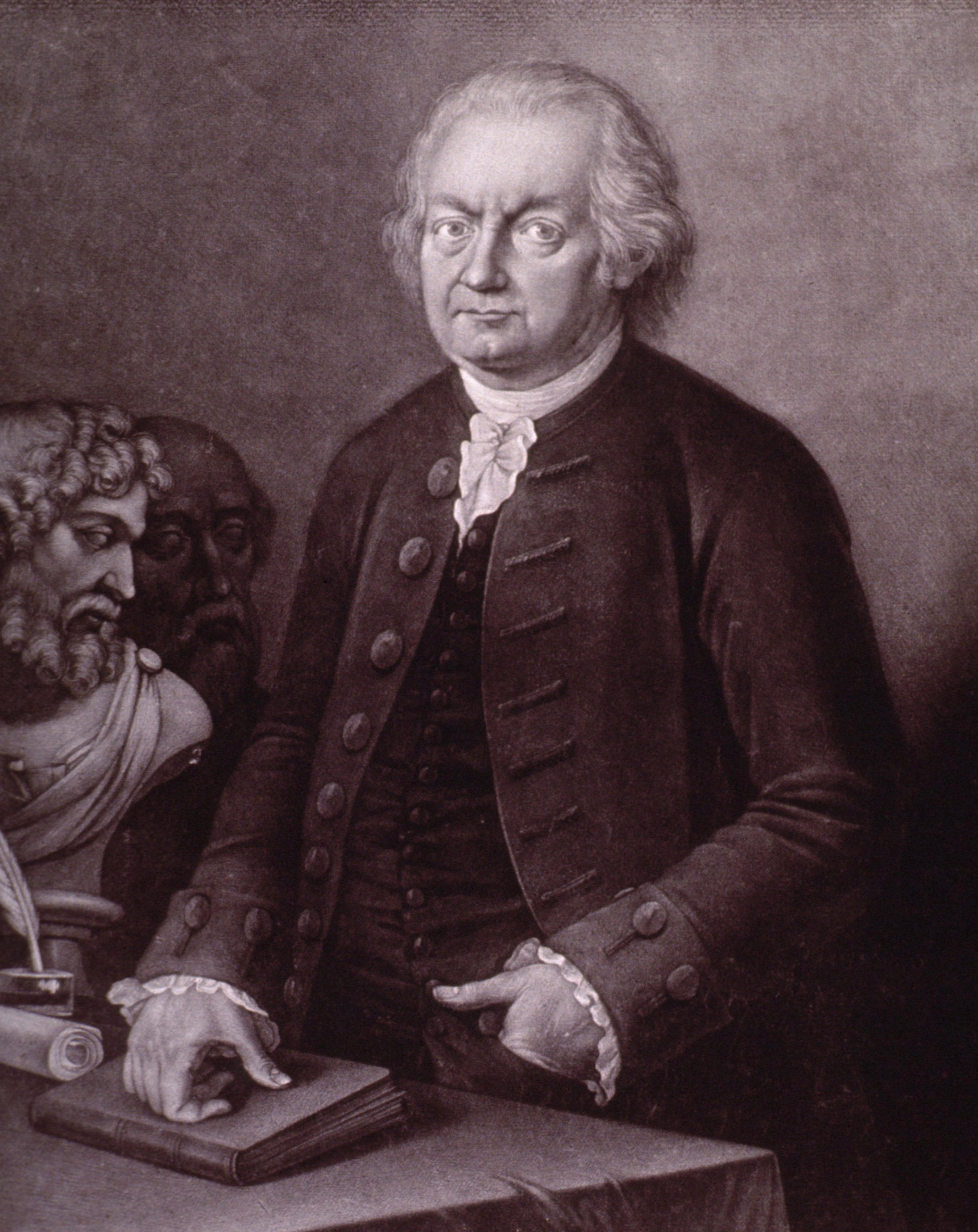
Johann Gottlob Leidenfrost

Johann Gottlob Leidenfrost (27 November 1715 – 2 December 1794) was a German physician and theologian who first described the scientific phenomenon eponymously named the Leidenfrost effect.

== Personal life and career ==
Johann Gottlob Leidenfrost was born in Rosperwenda in the County of Stolberg-Stolberg. His father, Johann Heinrich Leidenfrost, was a well-known Lutheran minister. Little is known of Leidenfrost's life prior to the start of his academic career.

Leidenfrost first attended the University of Gießen where he followed in his father's footsteps by studying theology. He soon switched his academic concentration to medicine, following that career path in his subsequent attendance at the University of Leipzig and the University of Halle.

In 1741 he was awarded a doctorate in medicine largely based on a well-received treatise on the study of the movement of the human body, entitled On the Harmonious Relationship of Movements in the Human Body. After the conclusion of his academic studies, Leidenfrost spent some years traveling and took a post as a field physician in the first Silesian War.

In 1743 Leidenfrost was offered and accepted a professorship at the University of Duisburg. In 1745 he married a local Duisburg woman, Anna Cornelia Kalckhoff. Johann and Anna had seven children together, including Johanna Ulricke (1752–1819), who was later the wife of the noted German theologian, Christian Krafft. In addition to teaching medicine, physics and chemistry at the University of Duisburg, Leidenfrost also functioned as the university's rector, all the while maintaining a private medical practice.

In 1756, Leidenfrost became a member of the Berlin Academy of Sciences. During his lifetime, Leidenfrost published more than seventy manuscripts, including De Aquae Communis Nonnullis Qualitatibus Tractatus (A Tract About Some Qualities of Common Water, 1756) in which the Leidenfrost effect was first described (although the phenomenon had been previously observed by Herman Boerhaave in 1732). Leidenfrost died in Duisburg.

== Leidenfrost effect ==
Leidenfrost droplet

The effect Leidenfrost described is a phenomenon in which a liquid, in near contact with a mass significantly hotter than its boiling point, produces an insulating vapor layer which keeps that liquid from boiling rapidly. It is most commonly seen when cooking; one sprinkles drops of water in a skillet to gauge its temperature. If the skillet's temperature is at or above the Leidenfrost point, the water skitters across the metal and takes longer to evaporate than it would in a skillet that is hot, but at a temperature below the Leidenfrost point. It has also been used in some more risky demonstrations, such as dipping a wet finger in molten lead or blowing out a mouthful of liquid nitrogen, both enacted without injury to the demonstrator.

The Leidenfrost effect can be suppressed by virtue of structural design to decouple the liquid and vapor pathways, thus achieving the preferred superwetting and nucleate boiling of the liquid even on extremely high-temperature surfaces. As demonstrated in a structured thermal armor, the Leidenfrost effect can be prevented even over 1150 °C while maintaining efficient thermal cooling.
