= Recovery time (cooking) =

Recovery time is the length of time it takes a cooking medium, such as fat or water, to return to the desired cooking temperature after the food is submerged in it. The term also pertains to the recovery time for ovens to return to their preset cooking temperature after being opened.

== By cooking medium ==
=== Boiling and blanching ===
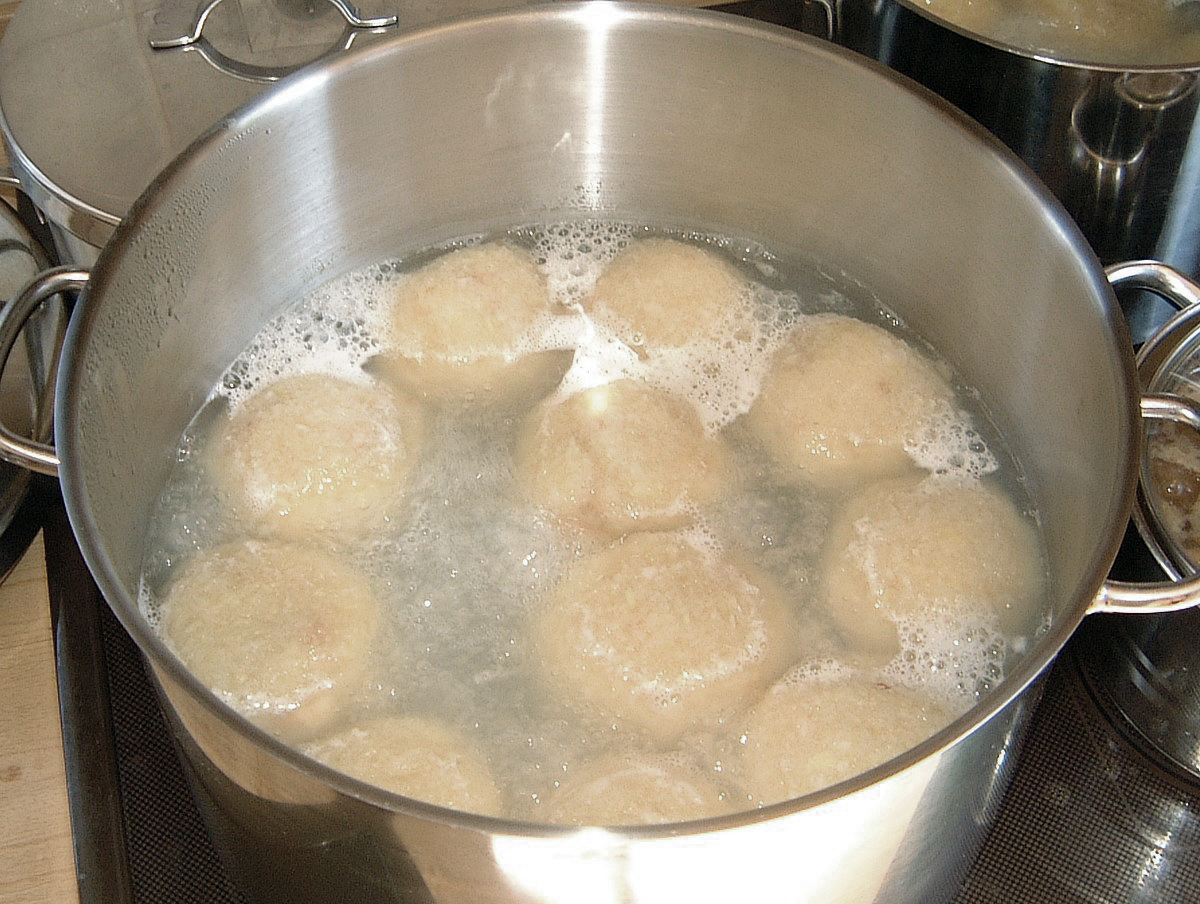
Potato dumplings being boiled

Boiling water has a recovery time which occurs when food is added to it, particularly large amounts of food. Methods to reduce recovery time are to use a larger quantity of water, cooking a lesser amount of food at a time, and using a stronger heat source. Industrial and restaurant blanching equipment is susceptible to a recovery time, in which the blanching liquor requires time to reheat to its preset cooking temperature.

=== Deep fryer ===
Deep fryers have a recovery time after food is cooked in them. A faster recovery time shortens the cooking time, which lessens the amount of oil absorbed into the deep fried foods. This results in a superior product compared to deep fried foods that are highly saturated with oil, and also reduces the amount of oil needed to be re-added to the deep fryer. The use of a 1:6 ratio of food content relative to oil content has been demonstrated to minimize recovery time in deep fryers.

=== Oven ===
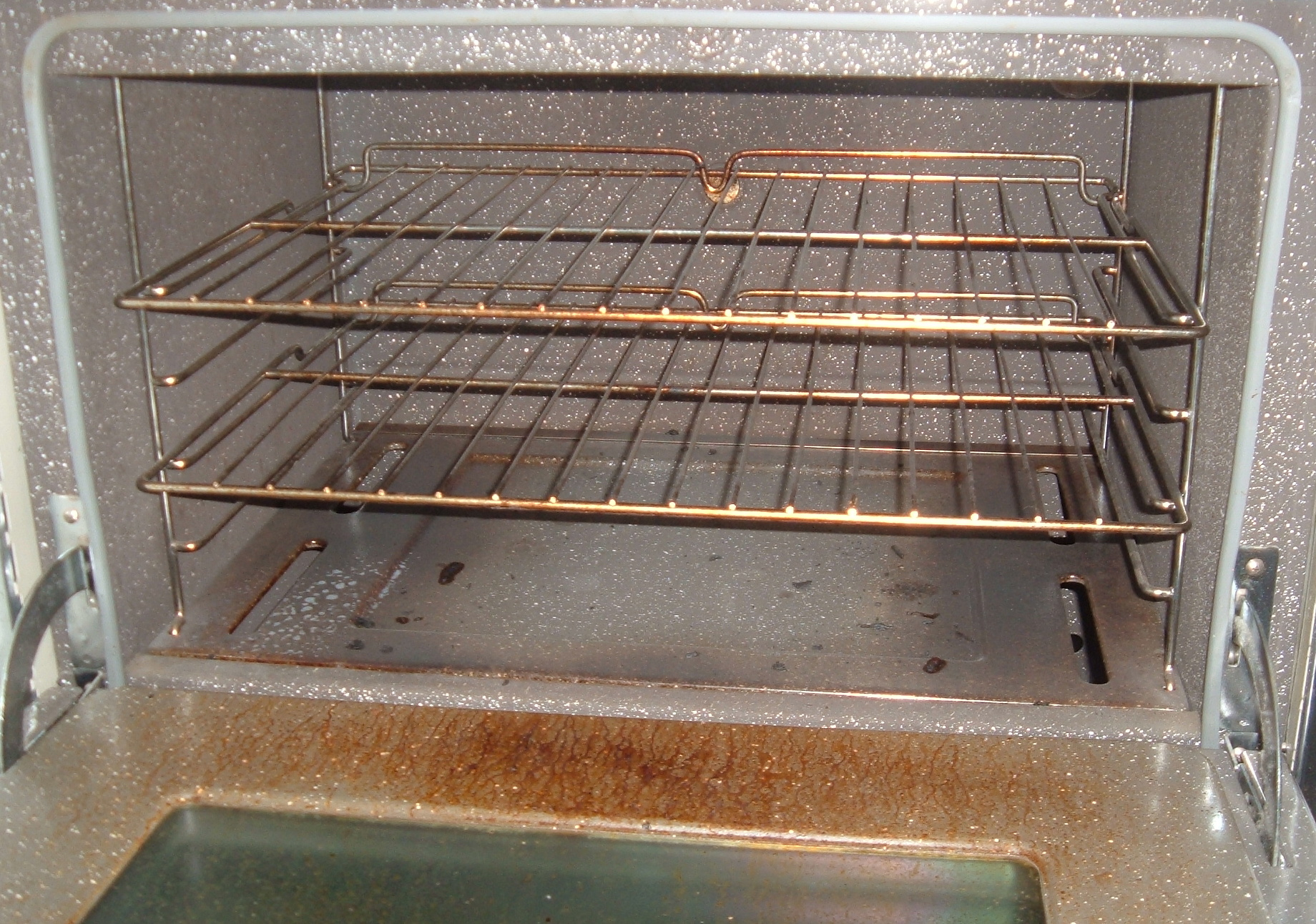
An opened oven creates a recovery time.

Ovens have a recovery time after being opened. Opening an oven door can reduce the temperature within an oven by up to 50°F (30°C). Methods to reduce oven recovery time include the placement of a baking stone or pizza stone, tiles made of ceramic, or a brick insert device in an oven, all of which serve to reduce recovery time through their heat retention properties.
