= Critical heat flux =

Heat flux at which boiling is no longer an effective method of heat transfer

In the study of heat transfer, critical heat flux (CHF) is the heat flux at which boiling ceases to be an effective form of transferring heat from a solid surface to a liquid.

== Description ==
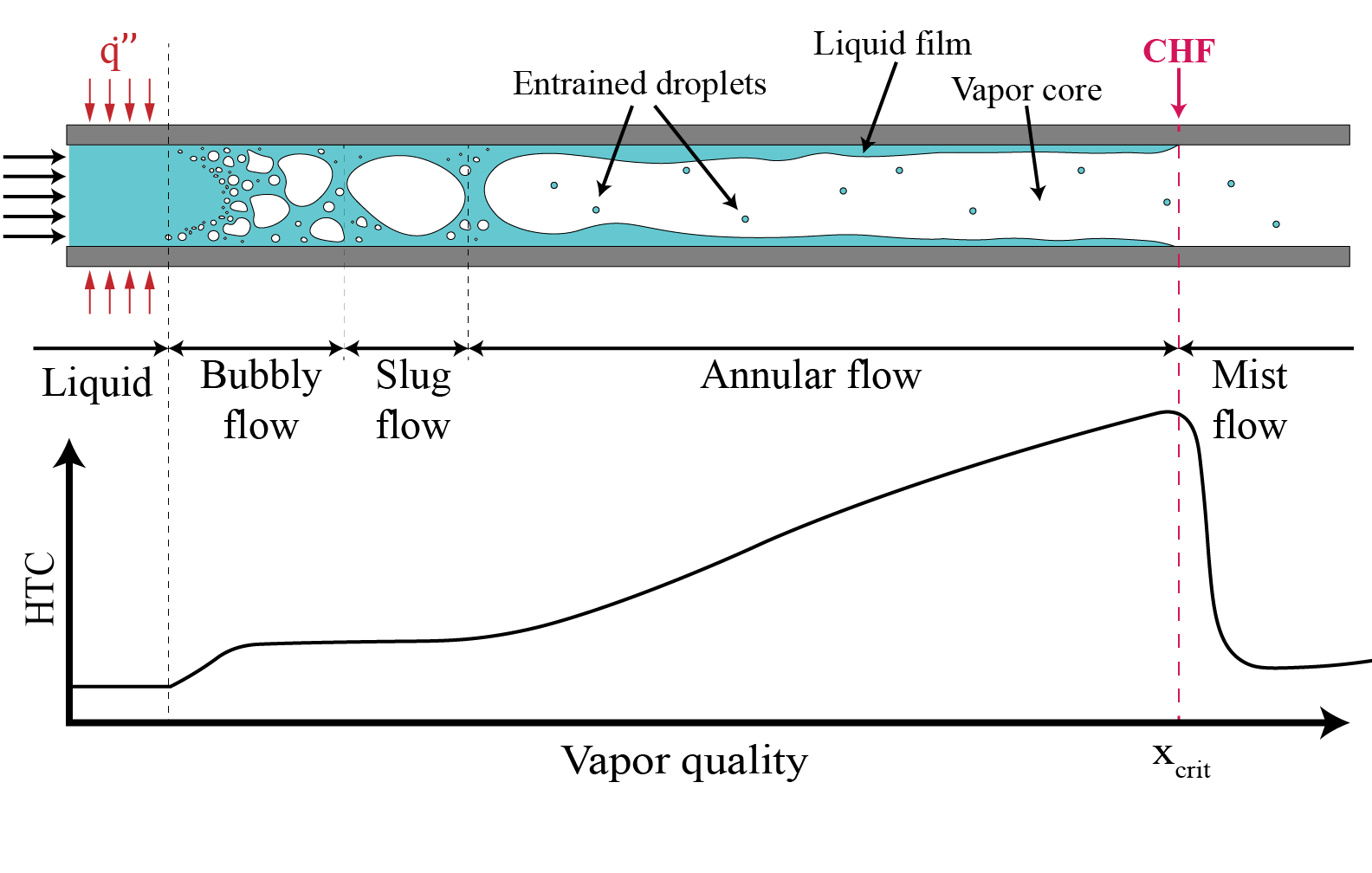
Flow boiling regime progression (top) and qualitative description of heat transfer (bottom).

Boiling systems are those in which liquid coolant absorbs energy from a heated solid surface and undergoes a change in phase. In flow boiling systems, the saturated fluid progresses through a series of flow regimes as vapor quality is increased. In systems that utilize boiling, the heat transfer rate is significantly higher than if the fluid were a single phase (i.e. all liquid or all vapor). The more efficient heat transfer from the heated surface is due to heat of vaporization and sensible heat. Therefore, boiling heat transfer has played an important role in industrial heat transfer processes such as macroscopic heat transfer exchangers in nuclear and fossil power plants, and in microscopic heat transfer devices such as heat pipes and microchannels for cooling electronic chips.

The use of boiling as a means of heat removal is limited by a condition called critical heat flux (CHF). The most serious problem that can occur around CHF is that the temperature of the heated surface may increase dramatically due to significant reduction in heat transfer. In industrial applications such as electronics cooling or instrumentation in space, the sudden increase in temperature may possibly compromise the integrity of the device.

== Two-phase heat transfer ==
The convective heat transfer between a uniformly heated wall and the working fluid is described by Newton's law of cooling:

$$q = h(T_w-T_f)\,$$

where $q$ represents the heat flux, $h$ represents the proportionality constant called the heat transfer coefficient, $T_w$ represents the wall temperature and $T_f$ represents the fluid temperature. If $h$ decreases significantly due to the occurrence of the CHF condition, $T_w$ will increase for fixed $q$ and $T_f$ while $q$ will decrease for fixed $\Delta T$.

== Modes of CHF ==
The understanding of CHF phenomenon and an accurate prediction of the CHF condition are important for safe and economic design of many heat transfer units including nuclear reactors, fossil fuel boilers, fusion reactors, electronic chips, etc. Therefore, the phenomenon has been investigated extensively over the world since Nukiyama first characterized it. In 1950 Kutateladze suggested the hydrodynamical theory of the burnout crisis. Much of significant work has been done during the last decades with the development of water-cooled nuclear reactors. Now many aspects of the phenomenon are well understood and several reliable prediction models are available for conditions of common interests.

The use of the term critical heat flux (CHF) is inconsistent among authors. The United States Nuclear Regulatory Commission has suggested using the term "critical boiling transition" (CBT) to indicate the phenomenon associated with a significant reduction in two-phase heat transfer. For a single species, the liquid phase generally has considerably better heat transfer properties than the vapor phase, namely thermal conductivity. So in general CBT is the result of some degree of liquid deficiency to a local position along a heated surface. The two mechanisms that result in reaching CBT are: departure from nucleate boiling (DNB) and liquid film dryout.

=== DNB ===
Departure from nucleate boiling (DNB) occurs in sub-cooled flows and bubbly flow regimes. DNB happens when many bubbles near the heated surface coalesce and impede the ability of local liquid to reach the surface. The mass of vapor between the heated surface and local liquid may be referred to as a vapor blanket.

=== Dryout ===
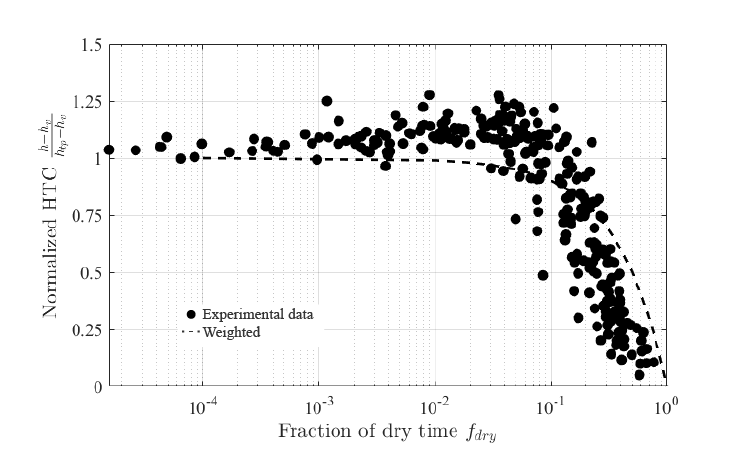
Figure from Morse et al. (2021)

Dryout means the local vaporization of the liquid on a heated surface. Dryout of liquid film occurs in annular flow. Annular flow is characterized by a vapor core, liquid film on the wall, and liquid droplets entrained within the core. Shear at the liquid-vapor interface drives the flow of the liquid film along the heated surface. In general, the two-phase HTC increases as the liquid-film thickness decreases. The process has been shown to occur over many instances of dryout events, which span a finite duration and are local to a position. The CBT occurs when the fraction of time a local position is subjected to dryout becomes significant. A single dryout event, or even several dryout events, may be followed by periods of sustained contact between the liquid film and the previously dry region . Many dryout events (hundreds or thousands) occurring in sequence are the mechanism for significant reduction in heat transfer-associated dryout CBT.

== Analytical description of dryout ==
The film is made up of two fields: the base film and the disturbance waves. Using first principles by way of an energy balance on a differential element in the base film region of the wave an analytical description of the dryout heat flux can easily be obtained. Assume that the heat flux needs to be such that the base film is vaporized the very instant a new arrives arrive.

Assuming all of the energy transferred from the heated surface to the saturated fluid is used for vaporization, Morse et al. show that the dryout CHF, ${q}^{''}_{do}$, can be calculated as:

$${q}^{''}_{do} =  \rho_l i_{fg} f_{w} \delta_{b}$$

where $\rho_{l}$ is the density of the liquid phase at saturation in kg/m$^3$, $i_{fg}$ is enthalpy of vaporization in J/kg , $f_{w}$ is the disturbance wave frequency in Hz, and $\delta_{b}$ is the base-film thickness in meters.

== Correlations for DNB ==
Many correlations exist that attempt to precict DNB-type critical heat flux. This is due to the lack of agreement on the physical mechanism throughout the available literature. Among the first to investigate DNB-type CHF and produce a correlation was Zuber, through a hydrodynamic stability analysis of the problem has developed an expression to approximate this point.

$${q}^{''}_{DNB} =
i_{fg}\rho_v \left[ \frac{\sigma g\left( \rho_l - \rho_v \right)}{\rho_v^2} \right]^\frac{1}{4}(1 +\rho_v/\rho_l )$$

where $\sigma$ is surface tension and surface tenstion, and $g$ the acceleration due to gravity on the earth's surface.

It is independent of the surface material and is weakly dependent upon the heated surface geometry described by the constant C. For large horizontal cylinders, spheres and large finite heated surfaces, the value of the Zuber constant $C = \frac{\pi}{24} \approx 0.131$. For large horizontal plates, a value of $C \approx 0.149$ is more suitable.

The critical heat flux depends strongly on pressure. At low pressures (including atmospheric pressure), the pressure dependence is mainly through the change in vapor density leading to an increase in the critical heat flux with pressure. However, as pressures approach the critical pressure, both the surface tension and the heat of vaporization converge to zero, making them the dominant sources of pressure dependency.

For water at 1 atm, the above equation calculates a critical heat flux of approximately 1000 kW/m^{2}.

=== Post-CHF ===
Post-CHF is used to denote the general heat transfer deterioration in flow boiling process, and liquid could be in the form of dispersed spray of droplets, continuous liquid core, or transition between the former two cases. Post-dryout can be specifically used to denote the heat transfer deterioration in the condition when liquid is only in the form of dispersed droplets, and denote the other cases by the term Post-DNB.

== See also ==
- Leidenfrost effect
- Nucleate boiling
