= Boiling =

Physical process

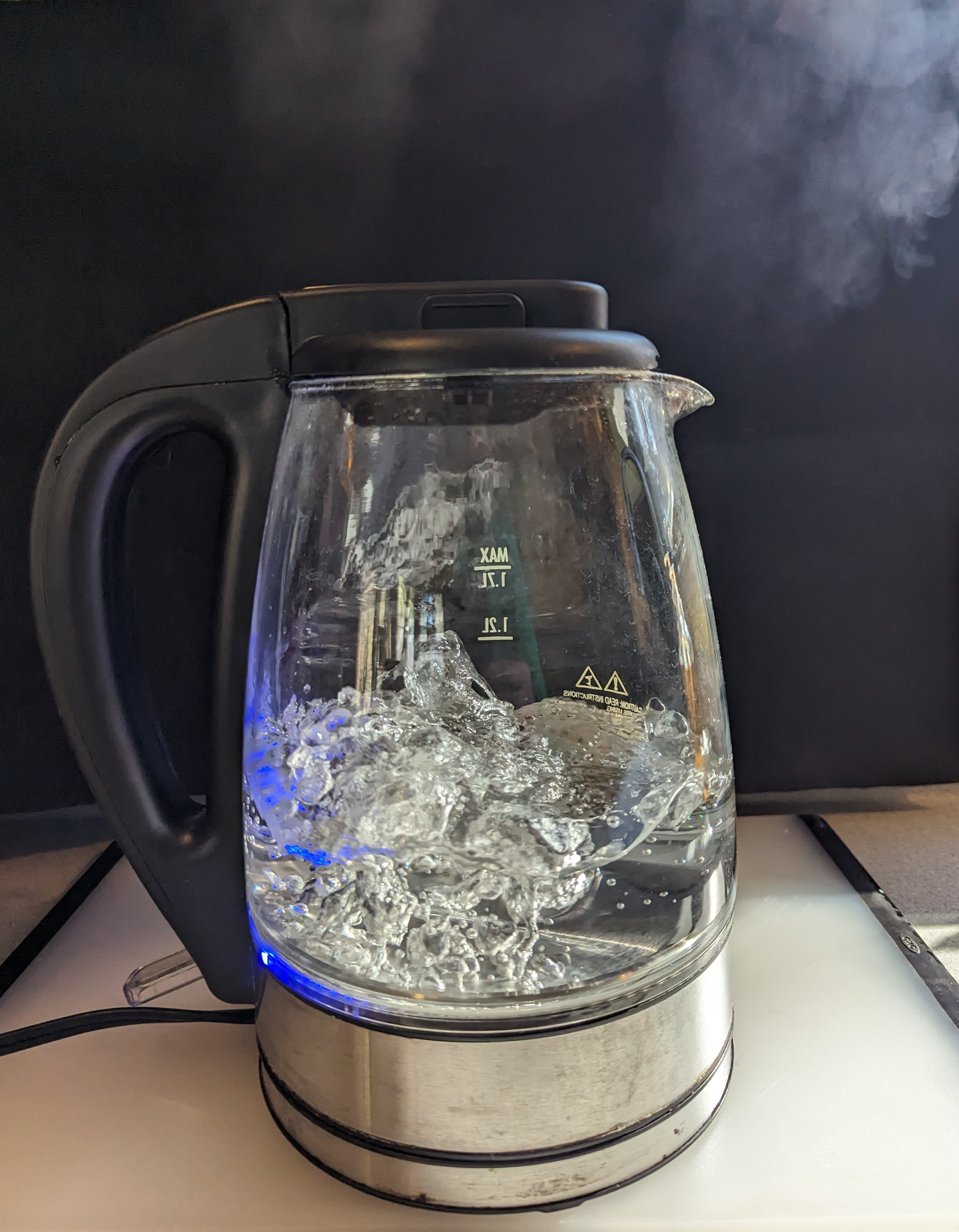
Rolling boil of water in an electric kettle

Boiling or ebullition is the rapid phase transition from liquid to gas or vapour; the reverse of boiling is condensation. Boiling occurs when a liquid is heated to its boiling point, so that the vapour pressure of the liquid is equal to the pressure exerted on the liquid by the surrounding atmosphere. Boiling and evaporation are the two main forms of liquid vapourization.

There are two main types of boiling: nucleate boiling, where small bubbles of vapour form at discrete points; and critical heat flux boiling, where the boiling surface is heated above a certain critical temperature and a film of vapour forms on the surface. Transition boiling is an intermediate, unstable form of boiling with elements of both types. The boiling point of water is 100 °C or 212 °F, but is lower with the decreased atmospheric pressure found at higher altitudes.

Boiling water is used as a method of making it potable by killing microbes and viruses that may be present. The sensitivity of different micro-organisms to heat varies, but if water is held at 100 °C (212 °F) for one minute, most micro-organisms and viruses are inactivated. Ten minutes at a temperature of 70 °C (158 °F) is also sufficient to inactivate most bacteria.

Boiling water is also used in several cooking methods including boiling, parboiling, blanching, steaming, and poaching.

== Types ==
=== Free convection ===
The lowest heat flux seen in boiling is only sufficient to cause natural convection, where the warmer fluid rises due to its slightly lower density. This condition occurs only when the superheat is very low, meaning that the hot surface near the fluid is nearly the same temperature as the boiling point.

=== Nucleate ===
A video showing water being boiled. As boiling proceeds, more nucleation sites (where bubbles are formed) can be seen.

Nucleate boiling is characterised by the growth of bubbles or pops on a heated surface (heterogeneous nucleation), which rises from discrete points on a surface, whose temperature is only slightly above the temperature of the liquid. In general, the number of nucleation sites is increased by an increasing surface temperature.

An irregular surface of the boiling vessel (i.e., increased surface roughness) or additives to the fluid (i.e., surfactants and/or nanoparticles) facilitate nucleate boiling over a broader temperature range, while an exceptionally smooth surface, such as plastic, lends itself to superheating. Under these conditions, a heated liquid may show boiling delay and the temperature may go somewhat above the boiling point without boiling.

Homogeneous nucleation, where the bubbles form from the surrounding liquid instead of on a surface, can occur if the liquid is warmer in its center, and cooler at the surfaces of the container. This can be done, for instance, in a microwave oven, which heats the water and not the container.

=== Critical heat flux ===
Critical heat flux (CHF) describes the thermal limit of a phenomenon where a phase change occurs during heating (such as bubbles forming on a metal surface used to heat water), which suddenly decreases the efficiency of heat transfer, thus causing localised overheating of the heating surface. As the boiling surface is heated above a critical temperature, a film of vapour forms on the surface. Since this vapour film is much less capable of carrying heat away from the surface, the temperature rises very rapidly beyond this point into the transition boiling regime. The point at which this occurs is dependent on the characteristics of boiling fluid and the heating surface in question.

=== Transition ===
Transition boiling may be defined as the unstable boiling, which occurs at surface temperatures between the maximum attainable in nucleate and the minimum attainable in film boiling.

The formation of bubbles in a heated liquid is a complex physical process which often involves cavitation and acoustic effects, such as the broad-spectrum hiss one hears in a kettle not yet heated to the point where bubbles boil to the surface.

=== Film ===
If a surface heating the liquid is significantly hotter than the liquid then film boiling will occur. A thin layer of vapour, which has low thermal conductivity, insulates the surface of the liquid. This condition of a vapour film insulating the surface from the liquid characterises film boiling.

== Influence of geometry ==
=== Pool boiling ===
"Pool boiling" refers to boiling where there is no forced convective flow. Instead, the flow occurs due to density gradients. It can experience any of the regimes mentioned above.

=== Flow boiling ===
"Flow boiling" occurs when the boiling fluid circulates, typically through pipes. Its movement can be powered by pumps, such as in power plants, or by density gradients, such as in a thermosiphon or a heat pipe. Flows in flow boiling are often characterised by a void fraction parameter, which indicates the fraction of the volume in the system that is vapor. One can use this fraction and the densities to calculate the vapor quality, which refers to the mass fraction that is in the gas phase. Flow boiling can be very complex, with heavy influences of density, flow rates, and heat flux, as well as surface tension. The same system may have regions that are liquid, gas, and two-phase flow. Such two phase regimes can lead to some of the best heat transfer coefficients of any system.

=== Confined boiling ===
Confined boiling refers to boiling in confined geometries, typically characterized by a Bond number that compares the gap spacing to the capillary length. Confined boiling regimes begin to play a major role when Bo < 0.5. This boiling regime is dominated by "vapour stem bubbles" left behind after vapour departs. These bubbles act as seeds for vapor growth. Confined boiling typically has higher heat transfer coefficient but a lower CHF than pool boiling. CHF occurs when the vapor momentum force at the two-phase interface balances the combined surface tension and hydrostatic forces, leading to irreversible growth of the dry spot. Confined boiling is particularly promising for electronics cooling.

== Physics ==
The boiling point of an element at a given pressure is a characteristic attribute of the element. This is also true for many simple compounds including water and simple alcohols. Once boiling has started and provided that boiling remains stable and the pressure is constant, the temperature of the boiling liquid remains constant. This attribute is part of the foundation of Celsius units, with 100 °C being the boiling point of water and 0 °C being the freezing point of water (although, initially in 1742, the two values were swapped with 100 °C being the freezing point and 0 °C being the boiling point.)

=== Distillation ===
Mixtures of volatile liquids have a boiling point specific to that mixture producing vapour with a constant mix of components - the constant boiling mixture. This attribute allows mixtures of liquids to be separated or partly separated by boiling and is best known as a means of separating ethanol from water.

== Uses ==
=== Refrigeration and air conditioning ===
Most types of refrigeration and some type of air-conditioning work by compressing a gas so that it becomes liquid and then allowing it to boil. This absorbs heat from the surroundings cooling the fridge or freezer or cooling the air entering a building. Typical liquids include propane, ammonia, carbon dioxide or nitrogen.

=== For making water potable ===
As a method of disinfecting water, bringing it to its boiling point at 100 °C (212 °F), is the oldest and most effective way since it does not affect the taste, it is effective despite contaminants or particles present in it, and is a single step process which eliminates most microbes responsible for causing intestine related diseases. The boiling point of water is 100 °C (212 °F) at sea level and at normal barometric pressure. In places with a proper water purification system, it is recommended only as an emergency treatment method or for obtaining potable water in the wilderness or in rural areas, as it cannot remove chemical toxins or impurities.

The elimination of micro-organisms by boiling follows first-order kinetics—at high temperatures, it is achieved in less time and at lower temperatures, in more time. The heat sensitivity of micro-organisms varies, at 70 °C (158 °F), Giardia species (which cause giardiasis) can take ten minutes for complete inactivation, most intestine affecting microbes and E. coli (gastroenteritis) take less than a minute; at boiling point, Vibrio cholerae (cholera) takes ten seconds and hepatitis A virus (causes the symptom of jaundice), one minute. Boiling does not ensure the elimination of all micro-organisms; the bacterial spores Clostridium can survive at 100 °C (212 °F) but are not water-borne or intestine affecting. Thus for human health, complete sterilization of water is not required.

The traditional advice of boiling water for ten minutes is mainly for additional safety, since microbes start getting eliminated at temperatures greater than 60 °C (140 °F) and bringing it to its boiling point is also a useful indication that can be seen without the help of a thermometer, and by this time, the water is disinfected. Though the boiling point decreases with increasing altitude, it is not enough to affect the disinfecting process.

=== In cooking ===
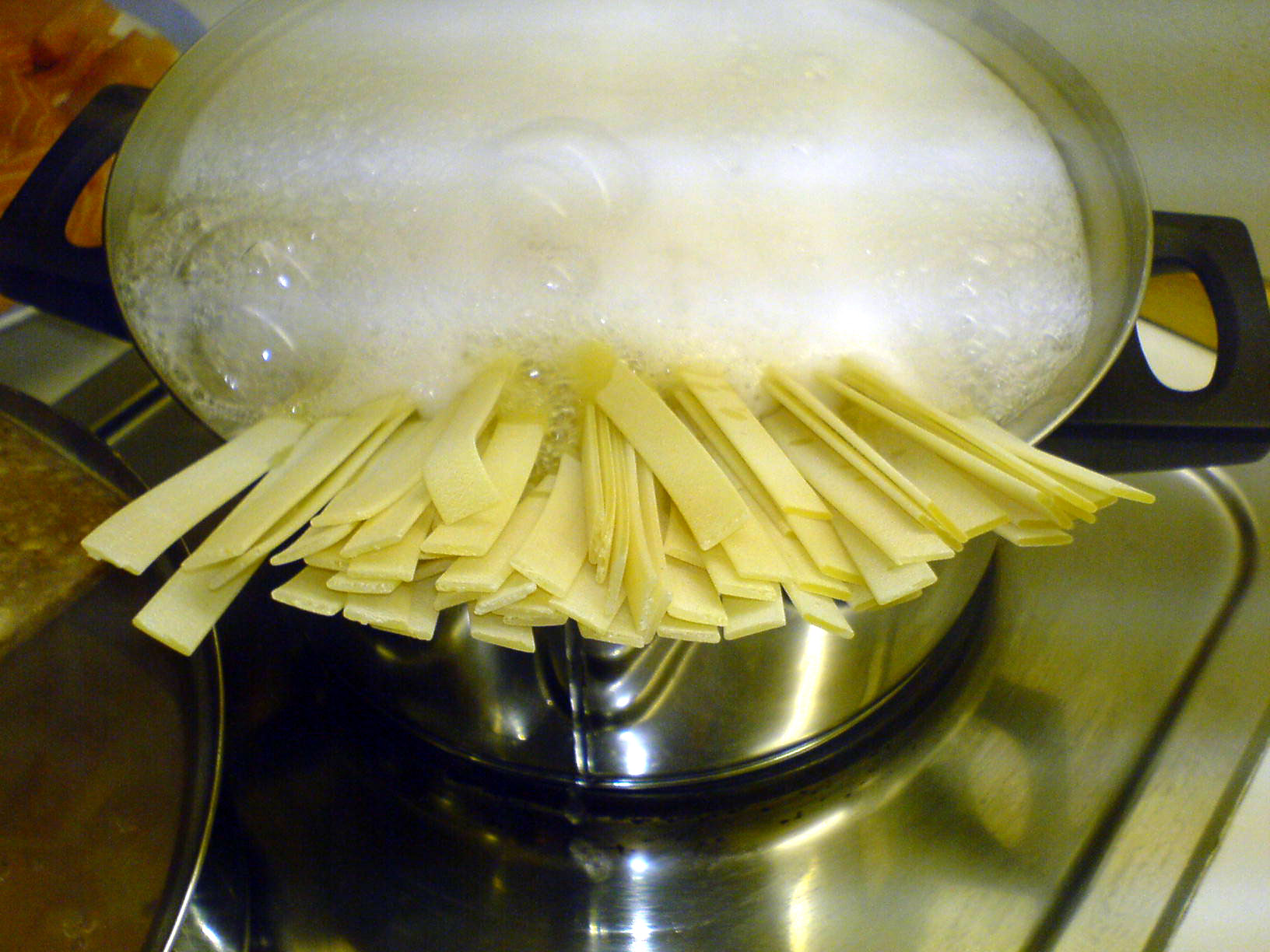
Boiling pasta

Boiling is the method of cooking food in boiling water or other water-based liquids such as stock or milk. Simmering is gentle boiling, while in poaching the cooking liquid moves but scarcely bubbles.

The boiling point of water is typically considered to be 100 °C (212 °F; 373 K), especially at sea level. Pressure and a change in the composition of the liquid may alter the boiling point of the liquid. High elevation cooking generally takes longer since boiling point is a function of atmospheric pressure. At an elevation of about one mile (1,600 m), water boils at approximately 95 °C (203 °F; 368 K). Depending on the type of food and the elevation, the boiling water may not be hot enough to cook the food properly. Similarly, increasing the pressure as in a pressure cooker raises the temperature of the contents above the open air boiling point.

=== Boil-in-the-bag ===
Also known as "boil-in-bag", this involves heating or cooking ready-made foods sealed in a thick plastic bag. The bag containing the food, often frozen, is submerged in boiling water for a prescribed time. The resulting dishes can be prepared with greater convenience as no pots or pans are dirtied in the process. Such meals are available for camping as well as home dining.

== Contrast with evaporation ==
At any given temperature, the molecules in a liquid have varying kinetic energies. Some high energy particles on the liquid surface may have enough energy to escape the intermolecular forces of attraction of the liquid and become a gas. This is called evaporation.

Evaporation only happens on the surface while boiling happens throughout the liquid. When a liquid reaches its boiling point bubbles of gas form in it which rise into the surface and burst into the air. This process is called boiling. If the boiling liquid is heated more strongly the temperature does not rise but the liquid boils more actively.

This distinction is exclusive to the liquid-to-gas transition; any transition directly from solid to gas is always referred to as sublimation regardless of whether it is at its boiling point or not.

== See also ==
- Enthalpy of vaporization
- Explosive boiling
- Phase diagram
- Phase transition
- Recovery time (culinary)
