= Heisler chart =

Graphs for analyzing 1–D conductive heat transfer

In thermal engineering, Heisler charts are a graphical analysis tool for the evaluation of heat transfer in transient, one-dimensional conduction. They are a set of two charts per included geometry introduced in 1947 by M. P. Heisler which were supplemented by a third chart per geometry in 1961 by H. Gröber. Heisler charts allow the evaluation of the central temperature for transient heat conduction through an infinitely long plane wall of thickness 2L, an infinitely long cylinder of radius r_{o}, and a sphere of radius r_{o}. Each aforementioned geometry can be analyzed by three charts which show the midplane temperature, temperature distribution, and heat transfer.

Although Heisler–Gröber charts are a faster and simpler alternative to the exact solutions of these problems, there are some limitations. First, the body must be at uniform temperature initially. Second, the Fourier's number of the analyzed object should be bigger than 0.2. Additionally, the temperature of the surroundings and the convective heat transfer coefficient must remain constant and uniform. Also, there must be no heat generation from the body itself.

== Infinitely long plane wall ==
These first Heisler–Gröber charts were based upon the first term of the exact Fourier series solution for an infinite plane wall:

$\frac{T(x,t)-T_\infty}{T_i-T_\infty}=\sum_{n=0}^{\infty}{\left[\frac{4\sin{\lambda_n}}{2\lambda_n + \sin{2\lambda_n}} e^{-\lambda_n^2\frac{\alpha t}{L^2}}\cos{ \frac{\lambda_n x}{L}}\right]},$

where T_{i} is the initial uniform temperature of the slab, T_{∞} is the constant environmental temperature imposed at the boundary, x is the location in the plane wall, λ is the root of λ * tan λ = Bi, and α is thermal diffusivity. The position x = 0 represents the center of the slab.

The first chart for the plane wall is plotted using three different variables. Plotted along the vertical axis of the chart is dimensionless temperature at the midplane, $\theta_o^*= \frac{T(0,t)-T_\infty}{T_i-T_\infty}.$ Plotted along the horizontal axis is the Fourier number, Fo = αt/L^{2}. The curves within the graph are a selection of values for the inverse of the Biot number, where Bi = hL/k. k is the thermal conductivity of the material and h is the heat transfer coefficient.

The second chart is used to determine the variation of temperature within the plane wall at other location in the x-direction at the same time of $To$ for different Biot numbers. The vertical axis is the ratio of a given temperature to that at the centerline $\frac\theta{\theta_o} = \frac{T(x,t)-T_\infty}{T(0,t)-T_\infty}$ where the x/L curve is the position at which T is taken. The horizontal axis is the value of Bi^{−1}.

The third chart in each set was supplemented by Gröber in 1961, and this particular one shows the dimensionless heat transferred from the wall as a function of a dimensionless time variable. The vertical axis is a plot of Q/Q_{o}, the ratio of actual heat transfer to the amount of total possible heat transfer before T = T_{∞}. On the horizontal axis is the plot of (Bi^{2})(Fo), a dimensionless time variable.

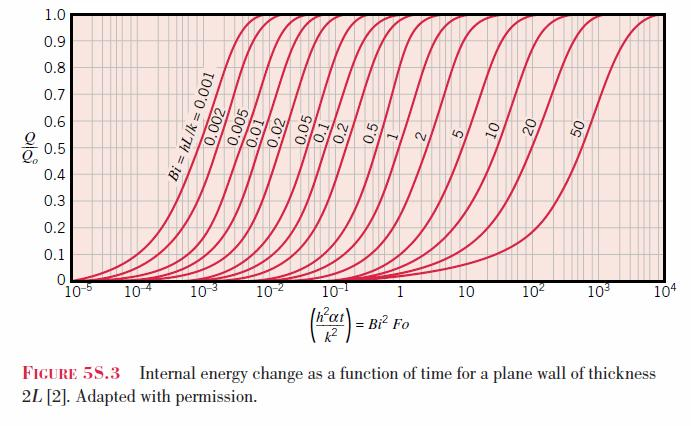

== Infinitely long cylinder ==
For the infinitely long cylinder, the Heisler chart is based on the first term in an exact solution to a Bessel function.

Each chart plots similar curves to the previous examples, and on each axis is plotted a similar variable.

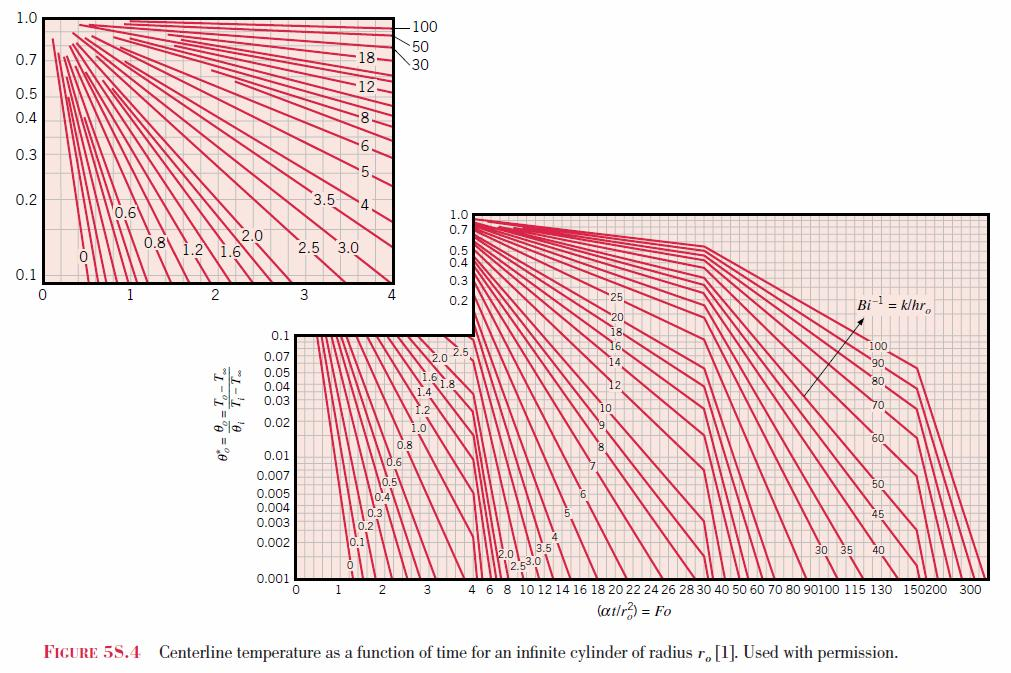

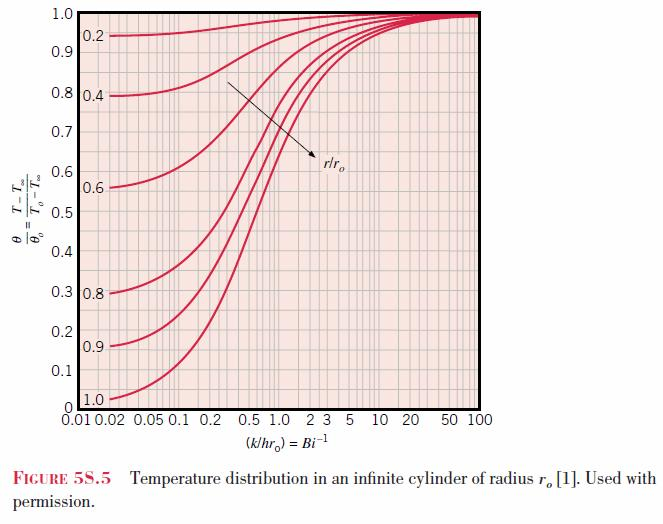

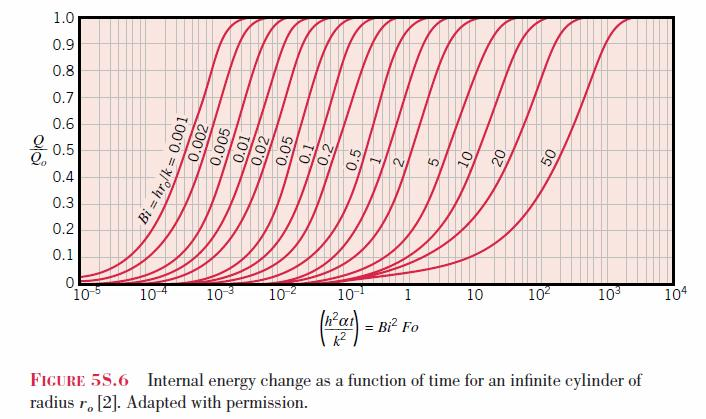

== Sphere (of radius r_{o}) ==
The Heisler chart for a sphere is based on the first term in the exact Fourier series solution:

These charts can be used similar to the first two sets and are plots of similar variables.

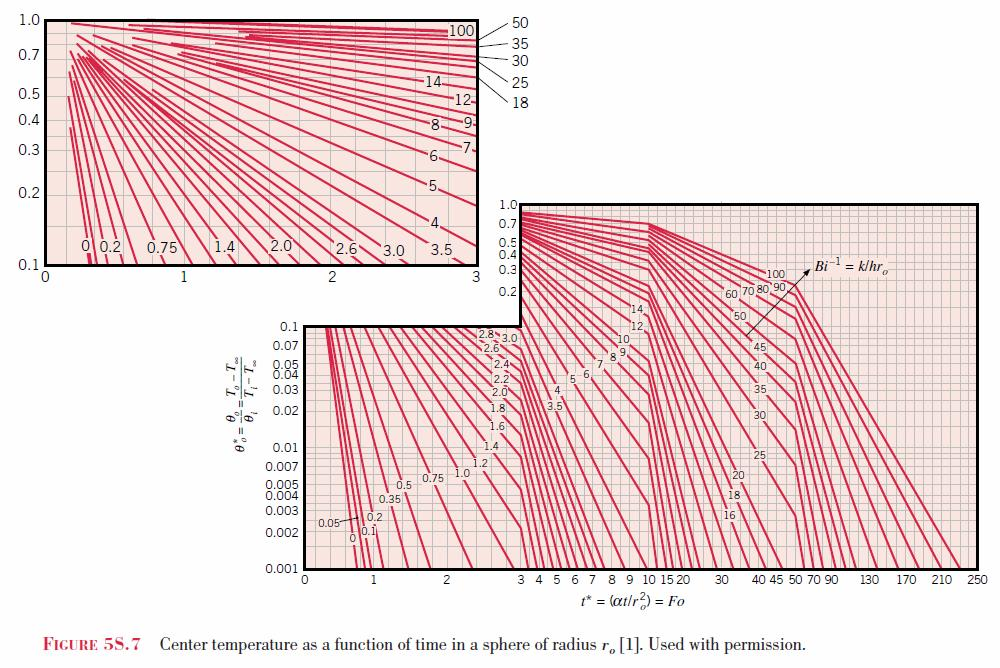

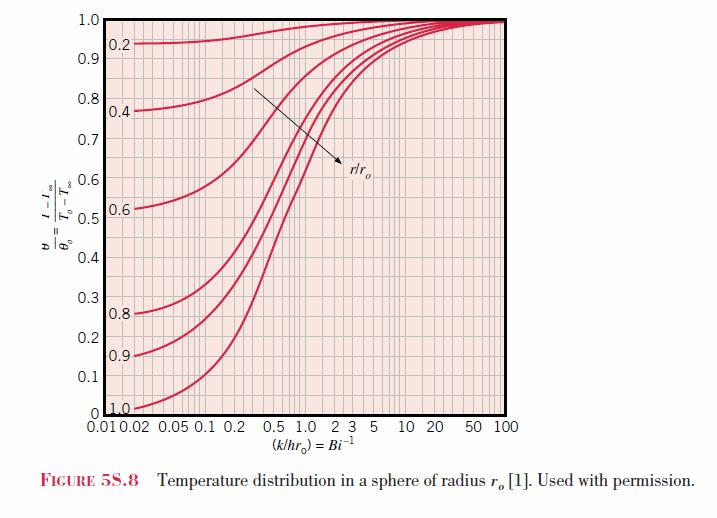

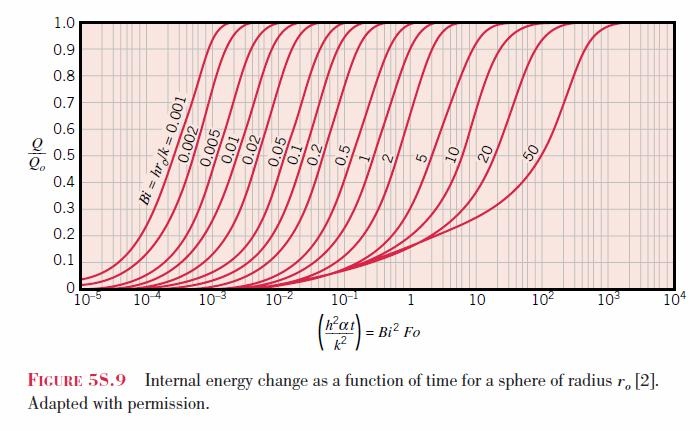

== See also ==
- Convective heat transfer
- Heat transfer coefficient
- Biot number
- Fourier number
- Heat conduction
