= KRC Motors =

Italian motorcycle manufacturer

- Company type: Società a responsabilità limitata
- Industry: Motorcycle manufacturer
- Founded: 2013
- Founder: Rampini Family
- Headquarters: Marcianise, Campania, Italy
- Key people: Francesco Rampini, Giulio Rampini
- Products: motorcycles, scooters
- Website: krc-motors.it

KRC Motors or more simply KRC is an Italian manufacturer of electric scooters, based in Marcianise.

== Company ==
KRC (keep road clean) Motors was born in Marcianise, Caserta (Campania) from the younger generation of the Rampini family.

The headquarters are in the industrial area of the city and here electric scooters are developed, assembled and tested in the company surface that measures over 15,000 meters.

== Technology ==
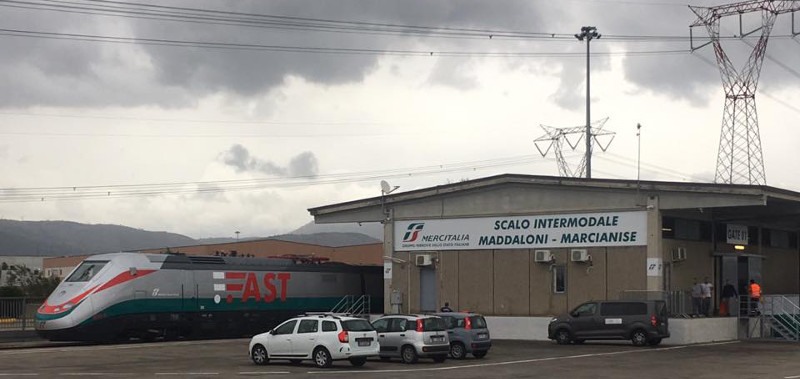
Railway terminal of the industrial area of Marcianise

The technology present on all vehicles includes air or liquid cooling, lithium batteries, brushless engines, produced by the company, with the possibility of rapid recharging (30 minutes) with a normal electrical outlet.

The scooters are equipped with various technologies concerning brakes, chassis, etc. The most important part however, in addition to the engine, is the battery pack which is composed of 24 solid 72Vdc cells. The control units are dedicated to monitoring the battery pack,

consequently to the balancing the performance and duration of the individual lithium cells.

== See also ==
- Electric motor
- Electric vehicle
