= List of things named after Joseph Fourier =

This is a list of things named after Joseph Fourier:

== Mathematics ==
- Budan–Fourier theorem, see Budan's theorem
- Fourier's theorem
- Fourier–Motzkin elimination
- Fourier algebra
- Fourier division
- Fourier method

=== Analysis ===
- Fourier analysis
- Fourier series
  - Fourier–Bessel series
  - Fourier sine and cosine series
  - Generalized Fourier series
  - Laplace–Fourier series, see Laplace series
  - Fourier–Legendre series
- Fourier transform (List of Fourier-related transforms):
    - Discrete-time Fourier transform (DTFT), the reverse of the Fourier series, a special case of the Z-transform around the unit circle in the complex plane
    - Discrete Fourier transform (DFT), occasionally called the finite Fourier transform, the Fourier transform of a discrete periodic sequence (yielding discrete periodic frequencies), which can also be thought of as the DTFT of a finite-length sequence evaluated at discrete frequencies
    - Fast Fourier transform (FFT), a fast algorithm for computing a Discrete Fourier transform
    - Finite Fourier transform
    - Fractional Fourier transform (FRFT), a linear transformation generalizing the Fourier transform, used in the area of harmonic analysis
  - Fourier–Deligne transform
  - Fourier–Mukai transform
- Fourier inversion theorem
  - Fourier integral theorem

== In physics and engineering ==
- Fourier's law of heat conduction
- Fourier number ($\text{Fo}$) (also known as the Fourier modulus), a ratio $\alpha t/d^2$ of the rate of heat conduction $\alpha t$ to the rate of thermal energy storage $d^2$
- Fourier optics
- Fourier-transform spectroscopy, a measurement technique whereby spectra are collected based on measurements of the temporal coherence of a radiative source

== Other ==
- Joseph Fourier University
- 10101 Fourier

== See also ==
- Fourier (disambiguation)
- List of Fourier-related transforms
- List of Fourier analysis topics
