= Lumped-element model =

Simplification of a physical system into a network of discrete components

Representation of a lumped model consisting of a voltage source and a resistor.

The lumped-element model (also called lumped-parameter model, or lumped-component model) is a simplified representation of a physical system or circuit that assumes all components are concentrated at a single point and their behavior can be described by idealized mathematical models. The lumped-element model simplifies the system or circuit behavior description into a topology. It is useful in electrical systems (including electronics), mechanical multibody systems, heat transfer, acoustics, etc. This is in contrast to distributed parameter systems or models in which the behaviour is distributed spatially and cannot be considered as localized into discrete entities.

The simplification reduces the state space of the system to a finite dimension, and the partial differential equations (PDEs) of the continuous (infinite-dimensional) time and space model of the physical system into ordinary differential equations (ODEs) with a finite number of parameters.

== Electrical systems ==
=== Lumped-matter discipline ===
The lumped-matter discipline is a set of imposed assumptions in electrical engineering that provides the foundation for lumped-circuit abstraction used in network analysis. The self-imposed constraints are:

1. The change of the magnetic flux in time outside a conductor is zero.
  $$\frac{\partial \Phi_B} {\partial t} = 0$$
2. The change of the charge in time inside conducting elements is zero.
  $$\frac{\partial q} {\partial t} = 0$$
3. Signal timescales of interest are much larger than propagation delay of electromagnetic waves across the lumped element.

The first two assumptions result in Kirchhoff's circuit laws when applied to Maxwell's equations and are only applicable when the circuit is in steady state. The third assumption is the basis of the lumped-element model used in network analysis. Less severe assumptions result in the distributed-element model, while still not requiring the direct application of the full Maxwell equations.

=== Lumped-element model ===
The lumped-element model of electronic circuits makes the simplifying assumption that the attributes of the circuit, resistance, capacitance, inductance, and gain, are concentrated into idealized electrical components; resistors, capacitors, and inductors, etc. joined by a network of perfectly conducting wires.

The lumped-element model is valid whenever $L_c \ll \lambda$, where $L_c$ denotes the circuit's characteristic length, and $\lambda$ denotes the circuit's operating wavelength. Otherwise, when the circuit length is on the order of a wavelength, we must consider more general models, such as the distributed-element model (including transmission lines), whose dynamic behaviour is described by Maxwell's equations. Another way of viewing the validity of the lumped-element model is to note that this model ignores the finite time it takes signals to propagate around a circuit. Whenever this propagation time is not significant to the application the lumped-element model can be used. This is the case when the propagation time is much less than the period of the signal involved. However, with increasing propagation time there will be an increasing error between the assumed and actual phase of the signal which in turn results in an error in the assumed amplitude of the signal. The exact point at which the lumped-element model can no longer be used depends to a certain extent on how accurately the signal needs to be known in a given application.

Real-world components exhibit non-ideal characteristics which are, in reality, distributed elements but are often represented to a first-order approximation by lumped elements. To account for leakage in capacitors for example, we can model the non-ideal capacitor as having a large lumped resistor connected in parallel even though the leakage is, in reality distributed throughout the dielectric. Similarly a wire-wound resistor has significant inductance as well as resistance distributed along its length but we can model this as a lumped inductor in series with the ideal resistor.

== Thermal systems ==
A lumped-capacitance model, also called lumped system analysis, reduces a thermal system to a number of discrete “lumps” and assumes that the temperature difference inside each lump is negligible. This approximation is useful to simplify otherwise complex differential heat equations. It was developed as a mathematical analog of electrical capacitance, although it also includes thermal analogs of electrical resistance as well.

The lumped-capacitance model is a common approximation in transient conduction, which may be used whenever heat conduction within an object is much faster than heat transfer across the boundary of the object. The method of approximation then suitably reduces one aspect of the transient conduction system (spatial temperature variation within the object) to a more mathematically tractable form (that is, it is assumed that the temperature within the object is completely uniform in space, although this spatially uniform temperature value changes over time). The rising uniform temperature within the object or part of a system, can then be treated like a capacitative reservoir which absorbs heat until it reaches a steady thermal state in time (after which temperature does not change within it).

An early-discovered example of a lumped-capacitance system which exhibits mathematically simple behavior due to such physical simplifications, are systems which conform to Newton's law of cooling. This law simply states that the temperature of a hot (or cold) object progresses toward the temperature of its environment in a simple exponential fashion. Objects follow this law strictly only if the rate of heat conduction within them is much larger than the heat flow into or out of them. In such cases it makes sense to talk of a single "object temperature" at any given time (since there is no spatial temperature variation within the object) and also the uniform temperatures within the object allow its total thermal energy excess or deficit to vary proportionally to its surface temperature, thus setting up the Newton's law of cooling requirement that the rate of temperature decrease is proportional to difference between the object and the environment. This in turn leads to simple exponential heating or cooling behavior (details below).

=== Method ===
To determine the number of lumps, the Biot number (Bi), a dimensionless parameter of the system, is used. Bi is defined as the ratio of the conductive heat resistance within the object to the convective heat transfer resistance across the object's boundary with a uniform bath of different temperature. When the thermal resistance to heat transferred into the object is larger than the resistance to heat being diffused completely within the object, the Biot number is less than 1. In this case, particularly for Biot numbers which are even smaller, the approximation of spatially uniform temperature within the object can begin to be used, since it can be presumed that heat transferred into the object has time to uniformly distribute itself, due to the lower resistance to doing so, as compared with the resistance to heat entering the object.

If the Biot number is less than 0.1 for a solid object, then the entire material will be nearly the same temperature, with the dominant temperature difference being at the surface. It may be regarded as being "thermally thin". The Biot number must generally be less than 0.1 for usefully accurate approximation and heat transfer analysis. The mathematical solution to the lumped-system approximation gives Newton's law of cooling.

A Biot number greater than 0.1 (a "thermally thick" substance) indicates that one cannot make this assumption, and more complicated heat transfer equations for "transient heat conduction" will be required to describe the time-varying and non-spatially-uniform temperature field within the material body.

The single capacitance approach can be expanded to involve many resistive and capacitive elements, with Bi < 0.1 for each lump. As the Biot number is calculated based upon a characteristic length of the system, the system can often be broken into a sufficient number of sections, or lumps, so that the Biot number is acceptably small.

Some characteristic lengths of thermal systems are:

- Plate: thickness
- Fin: thickness/2
- Long cylinder: diameter/4
- Sphere: diameter/6

For arbitrary shapes, it may be useful to consider the characteristic length to be volume / surface area.

==== Thermal purely resistive circuits ====
A useful concept used in heat transfer applications once the condition of steady state heat conduction has been reached, is the representation of thermal transfer by what is known as thermal circuits. A thermal circuit is the representation of the resistance to heat flow in each element of a circuit, as though it were an electrical resistor. The heat transferred is analogous to the electric current and the thermal resistance is analogous to the electrical resistor. The values of the thermal resistance for the different modes of heat transfer are then calculated as the denominators of the developed equations. The thermal resistances of the different modes of heat transfer are used in analyzing combined modes of heat transfer. The lack of "capacitative" elements in the following purely resistive example, means that no section of the circuit is absorbing energy or changing in distribution of temperature. This is equivalent to demanding that a state of steady state heat conduction (or transfer, as in radiation) has already been established.

The equations describing the three heat transfer modes and their thermal resistances in steady state conditions, as discussed previously, are summarized in the table below:

Equations for different heat transfer modes and their thermal resistances.
Transfer Mode	Rate of Heat Transfer	Thermal Resistance
Conduction	$\dot{Q}=\frac{T_1-T_2}{\left ( \frac{L}{kA} \right )}$	$\frac{L}{kA}$
Convection	$\dot{Q}=\frac{T_{\rm surf}-T_{\rm envr}}{\left ( \frac{1}{h_{\rm conv}A_{\rm surf}} \right )}$	$\frac{1}{h_{\rm conv}A_{\rm surf}}$
Radiation	$\dot{Q}=\frac{T_{\rm surf}-T_{\rm surr}}{\left ( \frac{1}{h_rA_{\rm surf}} \right )}$	$\frac{1}{h_rA}$, where $h_r= \epsilon \sigma (T_{\rm surf}^{2}+T_{\rm surr}^{2})(T_{\rm surf}+T_{\rm surr})$

In cases where there is heat transfer through different media (for example, through a composite material), the equivalent resistance is the sum of the resistances of the components that make up the composite. Likely, in cases where there are different heat transfer modes, the total resistance is the sum of the resistances of the different modes. Using the thermal circuit concept, the amount of heat transferred through any medium is the quotient of the temperature change and the total thermal resistance of the medium.

As an example, consider a composite wall of cross-sectional area $A$. The composite is made of an $L_1$ long cement plaster with a thermal coefficient $k_1$ and $L_2$ long paper faced fiber glass, with thermal coefficient $k_2$. The left surface of the wall is at $T_i$ and exposed to air with a convective coefficient of $h_i$. The right surface of the wall is at $T_o$ and exposed to air with convective coefficient $h_o$.

Using the thermal resistance concept, heat flow through the composite is as follows:
$$\dot{Q}=\frac{T_i-T_o}{R_i+R_1+R_2+R_o}=\frac{T_i-T_1}{R_i}=\frac{T_i-T_2}{R_i+R_1}=\frac{T_i-T_3}{R_i+R_1+R_2}=\frac{T_1-T_2}{R_1}=\frac{T_3-T_o}{R_0}$$
where $R_i=\frac{1}{h_iA}$, $R_o=\frac{1}{h_oA}$, $R_1=\frac{L_1}{k_1A}$, and $R_2=\frac{L_2}{k_2A}$

==== Newton's law of cooling ====
Newton's law of cooling is an empirical relationship attributed to English physicist Sir Isaac Newton (1642–1727). This law stated in non-mathematical form is the following:

The rate of heat loss of a body is proportional to the temperature difference between the body and its surroundings.

Or, using symbols:
$$\text {Rate of cooling} \sim \Delta T$$

An object at a different temperature from its surroundings will ultimately come to a common temperature with its surroundings. A relatively hot object cools as it warms its surroundings; a cool object is warmed by its surroundings. When considering how quickly (or slowly) something cools, we speak of its rate of cooling – how many degrees' change in temperature per unit of time.

The rate of cooling of an object depends on how much hotter the object is than its surroundings. The temperature change per minute of a hot apple pie will be more if the pie is put in a cold freezer than if it is placed on the kitchen table. When the pie cools in the freezer, the temperature difference between it and its surroundings is greater. On a cold day, a warm home will leak heat to the outside at a greater rate when there is a large difference between the inside and outside temperatures. Keeping the inside of a home at high temperature on a cold day is thus more costly than keeping it at a lower temperature. If the temperature difference is kept small, the rate of cooling will be correspondingly low.

As Newton's law of cooling states, the rate of cooling of an object – whether by conduction, convection, or radiation – is approximately proportional to the temperature difference ΔT. Frozen food will warm up faster in a warm room than in a cold room. Note that the rate of cooling experienced on a cold day can be increased by the added convection effect of the wind. This is referred to as wind chill. For example, a wind chill of -20 °C means that heat is being lost at the same rate as if the temperature were -20 °C without wind.

==== Applicable situations ====
This law describes many situations in which an object has a large thermal capacity and large conductivity, and is suddenly immersed in a uniform bath which conducts heat relatively poorly. It is an example of a thermal circuit with one resistive and one capacitative element. For the law to be correct, the temperatures at all points inside the body must be approximately the same at each time point, including the temperature at its surface. Thus, the temperature difference between the body and surroundings does not depend on which part of the body is chosen, since all parts of the body have effectively the same temperature. In these situations, the material of the body does not act to "insulate" other parts of the body from heat flow, and all of the significant insulation (or "thermal resistance") controlling the rate of heat flow in the situation resides in the area of contact between the body and its surroundings. Across this boundary, the temperature-value jumps in a discontinuous fashion.

In such situations, heat can be transferred from the exterior to the interior of a body, across the insulating boundary, by convection, conduction, or diffusion, so long as the boundary serves as a relatively poor conductor with regard to the object's interior. The presence of a physical insulator is not required, so long as the process which serves to pass heat across the boundary is "slow" in comparison to the conductive transfer of heat inside the body (or inside the region of interest—the "lump" described above).

In such a situation, the object acts as the "capacitative" circuit element, and the resistance of the thermal contact at the boundary acts as the (single) thermal resistor. In electrical circuits, such a combination would charge or discharge toward the input voltage, according to a simple exponential law in time. In the thermal circuit, this configuration results in the same behavior in temperature: an exponential approach of the object temperature to the bath temperature.

==== Mathematical statement ====
Newton's law is mathematically stated by the simple first-order differential equation:
$$\frac{d Q}{d t} = - h \cdot A(T(t)- T_{\text{env}}) =  - h \cdot A \Delta T(t)$$
where

- Q is thermal energy in joules
- h is the heat transfer coefficient between the surface and the fluid
- A is the surface area of the heat being transferred
- T is the temperature of the object's surface and interior (since these are the same in this approximation)
- T_{env} is the temperature of the environment
- ΔT(t) = T(t) − T_{env} is the time-dependent thermal gradient between environment and object

Putting heat transfers into this form is sometimes not a very good approximation, depending on ratios of heat conductances in the system. If the differences are not large, an accurate formulation of heat transfers in the system may require analysis of heat flow based on the (transient) heat transfer equation in nonhomogeneous or poorly conductive media.

==== Solution in terms of object heat capacity ====
If the entire body is treated as lumped-capacitance heat reservoir, with total heat content which is proportional to simple total heat capacity $C$, and $T$, the temperature of the body, or $Q = C T$. It is expected that the system will experience exponential decay with time in the temperature of a body.

From the definition of heat capacity $C$ comes the relation $C = dQ/dT$. Differentiating this equation with regard to time gives the identity (valid so long as temperatures in the object are uniform at any given time): $dQ/dt = C (dT/dt)$. This expression may be used to replace $dQ/dt$ in the first equation which begins this section, above. Then, if $T(t)$ is the temperature of such a body at time $t$, and $T_\text{env}$ is the temperature of the environment around the body:
$$\frac{d T(t)}{d t} = - r (T(t) - T_{\text{env}}) = - r \Delta T(t)$$
where $r = hA/C$ is a positive constant characteristic of the system, which must be in units of $s^{-1}$, and is therefore sometimes expressed in terms of a characteristic time constant $t_0$ given by: $t_0 = 1/r = -\Delta T(t)/(dT(t)/dt)$. Thus, in thermal systems, $t_0 = C/hA$. (The total heat capacity $C$ of a system may be further represented by its mass-specific heat capacity $c_p$ multiplied by its mass $m$, so that the time constant $t_0$ is also given by $mc_p/hA$).

The solution of this differential equation, by standard methods of integration and substitution of boundary conditions, gives:
$$T(t) = T_{\mathrm{env}} + (T(0) - T_{\mathrm{env}}) \ e^{-r t}.$$

If:

$\Delta T(t) \quad$ is defined as : $T(t) - T_{\mathrm{env}} \ , \quad$ where $\Delta T(0)\quad$ is the initial temperature difference at time 0,

then the Newtonian solution is written as:
$$\Delta T(t) = \Delta T(0) \ e^{-r t} = \Delta T(0) \ e^{-t/t_0}.$$

This same solution is almost immediately apparent if the initial differential equation is written in terms of $\Delta T(t)$, as the single function to be solved for.
$$\frac{d T(t)}{d t} = \frac{d \Delta T(t)}{d t} = - \frac{1}{t_0} \Delta T(t)$$

=== Applications ===
This mode of analysis has been applied to forensic sciences to analyze the time of death of humans. Also, it can be applied to HVAC (heating, ventilating and air-conditioning, which can be referred to as "building climate control"), to ensure more nearly instantaneous effects of a change in comfort level setting.

== Mechanical systems ==
The simplifying assumptions in this domain are:

- all objects are rigid bodies;
- all interactions between rigid bodies take place via kinematic pairs (joints), springs and dampers.

== Acoustics ==
In this context, the lumped-component model extends the distributed concepts of acoustic theory subject to approximation. In the acoustical lumped-component model, certain physical components with acoustical properties may be approximated as behaving similarly to standard electronic components or simple combinations of components.

- A rigid-walled cavity containing air (or similar compressible fluid) may be approximated as a capacitor whose value is proportional to the volume of the cavity. The validity of this approximation relies on the shortest wavelength of interest being significantly (much) larger than the longest dimension of the cavity.
- A reflex port may be approximated as an inductor whose value is proportional to the effective length of the port divided by its cross-sectional area. The effective length is the actual length plus an end correction. This approximation relies on the shortest wavelength of interest being significantly larger than the longest dimension of the port.
- Certain types of damping material can be approximated as a resistor. The value depends on the properties and dimensions of the material. The approximation relies in the wavelengths being long enough and on the properties of the material itself.
- A loudspeaker drive unit (typically a woofer or subwoofer drive unit) may be approximated as a series connection of a zero-impedance voltage source, a resistor, a capacitor and an inductor. The values depend on the specifications of the unit and the wavelength of interest.

== Heat transfer for buildings ==
A simplifying assumption in this domain is that all heat transfer mechanisms are linear, implying that radiation and convection are linearised for each problem.

Several publications can be found that describe how to generate lumped-element models of buildings. In most cases, the building is considered a single thermal zone and in this case, turning multi-layered walls into lumped elements can be one of the most complicated tasks in the creation of the model. The dominant-layer method is one simple and reasonably accurate method. In this method, one of the layers is selected as the dominant layer in the whole construction, this layer is chosen considering the most relevant frequencies of the problem.

Lumped-element models of buildings have also been used to evaluate the efficiency of domestic energy systems, by running many simulations under different future weather scenarios.

== Fluid systems ==
Fluid systems can be described by means of lumped-element cardiovascular models by using voltage to represent pressure and current to represent flow; identical equations from the electrical circuit representation are valid after substituting these two variables. Such applications can, for example, study the response of the human cardiovascular system to ventricular assist device implantation.

== See also ==
- System isomorphism
- Model order reduction
