= Biot number =

Ratio of the thermal resistances of a body's interior to its surface

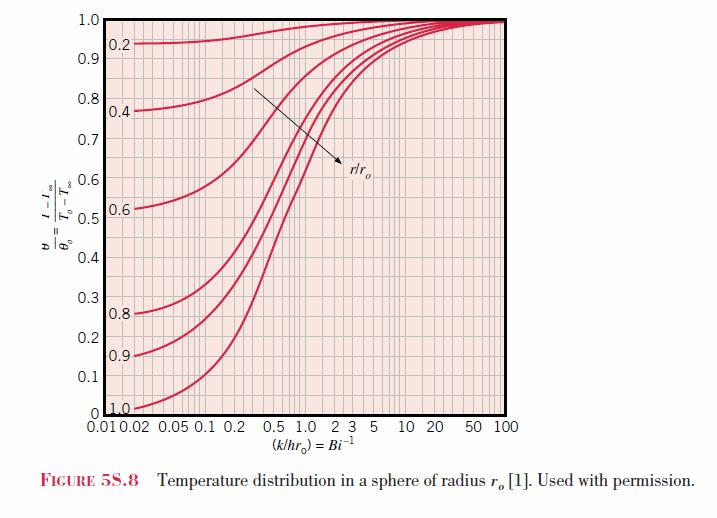
A temperature distribution chart with Bi on the x-axis

The Biot number (Bi) is a dimensionless quantity used in heat transfer calculations, named for the eighteenth-century French physicist Jean-Baptiste Biot (1774–1862). The Biot number is the ratio of the thermal resistance for conduction inside a body to the resistance for convection at the surface of the body. This ratio indicates whether the temperature inside a body varies significantly in space when the body is heated or cooled over time by a heat flux at its surface.

In general, problems involving small Biot numbers (much smaller than 1) are analytically simple, as a result of nearly uniform temperature fields inside the body. Biot numbers of order one or greater indicate more difficult problems with nonuniform temperature fields inside the body.

The Biot number appears in a number of heat transfer problems, including transient heat conduction and fin heat transfer calculations.

== Definition ==
The Biot number is defined as:

$$\mathrm{Bi} = \frac{h}{k} L$$

where:

- ${k}$ is the thermal conductivity of the body [W/(m·K)]
- ${h}$ is a convective heat transfer coefficient [W/(m^{2}·K)]
- ${L}$ is a characteristic length [m] of the geometry considered.

(The Biot number should not be confused with the Nusselt number, which employs the thermal conductivity of the fluid rather than that of the body.)

The characteristic length in most relevant problems becomes the heat characteristic length, i.e. the ratio between the body volume and the heated (or cooled) surface of the body:
$$L = \frac{V}{A_\mathrm{Q}}$$
Here, the subscript Q, for heat, is used to denote that the surface to be considered is only the portion of the total surface through which the heat passes.

The physical significance of Biot number can be understood by imagining the heat flow from a small hot metal sphere suddenly immersed in a pool, to the surrounding fluid. The heat flow experiences two resistances: the first for conduction within the solid metal (which is influenced by both the size and composition of the sphere), and the second for convection at the surface of the sphere. If the thermal resistance of the fluid/sphere interface exceeds that thermal resistance offered by the interior of the metal sphere, the Biot number will be less than one. For systems where it is much less than one, the interior of the sphere may be presumed to be a uniform temperature, although this temperature may be changing with time as heat passes into the sphere from the surface. The equation to describe this change in (relatively uniform) temperature inside the object, is a simple exponential one described by Newton's law of cooling.

In contrast, the metal sphere may be large, so that the characteristic length is large and the Biot number is greater than one. Now, thermal gradients within the sphere become important, even though the sphere material is a good conductor. Equivalently, if the sphere is made of a poorly conducting (thermally insulating) material, such as wood or styrofoam, the interior resistance to heat flow will exceed that of convection at the fluid/sphere boundary, even for a much smaller sphere. In this case, again, the Biot number will be greater than one.

== Applications ==
The value of the Biot number can indicate the applicability (or inapplicability) of certain methods of solving transient heat transfer problems. For example, a Biot number smaller than about 0.1 implies that heat conduction inside the body offers much lower thermal resistance than the heat convection at the surface, so that temperature gradients are negligible inside of the body (such bodies are sometimes labeled "thermally thin"). In this situation, the simple lumped-capacitance model may be used to evaluate a body's transient temperature variation. The opposite is also true: a Biot number greater than about 0.1 indicates that thermal resistance within the body is not negligible, and more complex methods are need in analyzing heat transfer to or from the body (such bodies are sometimes called "thermally thick").

=== Heat conduction for finite Biot number ===
When the Biot number is greater than 0.1 or so, the heat equation must be solved to determine the time-varying and spatially-nonuniform temperature field within the body. Analytic methods for handling these problems, which may exist for simple geometric shapes and uniform material thermal conductivity, are described in the article on the heat equation. Examples of verified analytic solutions along with precise numerical values are available. Often such problems are too difficult to be done except numerically, with the use of a computer model of heat transfer.

=== Heat conduction for Bi ≪ 1 ===
As noted, a Biot number smaller than about 0.1 shows that the conduction resistance inside a body is much smaller than heat convection at the surface, so that temperature gradients are negligible inside of the body. In this case, the lumped-capacitance model of transient heat transfer can be used. (A Biot number less than 0.1 generally indicates less than 3% error will be present when using the lumped-capacitance model.)

The simplest type of lumped capacity solution, for a step change in fluid temperature, shows that a body's temperature decays exponentially in time ("Newtonian" cooling or heating) because the internal energy of the body is directly proportional to the temperature of the body, and the difference between the body temperature and the fluid temperature is linearly proportional to rate of heat transfer into or out of the body. Combining these relationships with the First law of thermodynamics leads to a simple first-order linear differential equation. The corresponding lumped capacity solution can be written

$$\frac{T - T_\infty}{T_0 - T_\infty} = e^{-t/\tau}$$

in which $\tau = \frac{\rho c_p V}{h A_Q}$ is the thermal time constant of the body, $\rho$ is the mass density (kg/m^{3}), and $c_p$ is specific heat capacity (J/kg-K).

The study of heat transfer in micro-encapsulated phase-change slurries is an application where the Biot number is useful. For the dispersed phase of the micro-encapsulated phase-change slurry, the micro-encapsulated phase-change material itself, the Biot number is calculated to be below 0.1 and so it can be assumed that thermal gradients within the dispersed phase are negligible.

== Mass transfer analogue ==
An analogous version of the Biot number (usually called the "mass transfer Biot number", or $\mathrm{Bi}_m$) is also used in mass diffusion processes:

$$\mathrm{Bi}_m=\frac{k_c}{D} L$$

where:

- ${k_c}$ : convective mass transfer coefficient (analogous to the h of the heat transfer problem)
- $D$ : mass diffusivity (analogous to the k of heat transfer problem)
- ${L}$ : characteristic length

== See also ==
- Convection
- Fourier number
- Heat conduction
