= Thermal conduction =

Process by which heat is transferred within an object

In thermodynamics, thermal conduction is the diffusion of thermal energy within one material or between materials in contact. The higher temperature object has molecules with more kinetic energy; diffusion among molecules distribute this kinetic energy until an object has the same kinetic energy throughout. Thermal conductivity, represented by k, is a property that relates the rate of heat loss per unit area to its rate of change of temperature. It accounts for any property that could change the way a material conducts heat. Heat spontaneously flows along a temperature gradient (i.e. from a hotter body to a colder body). For example, heat is conducted from the hotplate of an electric stove to the bottom of a saucepan in contact with it. In the absence of an opposing external driving energy source within a body or between bodies, temperature differences decay over time, and thermal equilibrium is approached.

Every process involving heat transfer takes place by one of three methods:

- Conduction: heat transfer by physical contact. (The matter is stationary on a macroscopic scale—thermal motion affects atoms and molecules at any temperature above absolute zero.) Heat transferred between the electric burner of a stove and the bottom of a pan is transferred by conduction.
- Convection: heat transfer by the macroscopic movement of a fluid. Examples: a forced-air furnace and in weather systems.
- Radiation: heat transfer by microwaves, infrared radiation, visible light, or other electromagnetic radiation. An obvious example is the warming of the Earth by the Sun. A less obvious example is thermal radiation from the human body.

A hotter region experiences greater molecular agitation. When a hotter object touches a cooler surface, the molecules from the hot object bump the molecules of the cooler surface, transferring kinetic energy, heating the colder object. Mathematically, thermal conduction works via diffusion. As temperature difference goes up, the distance traveled gets shorter, or the area goes up, thermal conduction increases:

$$\dot{Q} = \frac{\kappa A \Delta T}{\ell}$$

where

- $\dot{Q}$ is the thermal conduction or power (the energy transferred per unit time over some distance between the two temperatures),
- $\kappa$ is the thermal conductivity of the material,
- $A$ is the cross-sectional area of the object,
- $\Delta T$ is the difference in temperature from one side to the other,
- $\ell$ is the distance over which the heat is transferred.

Conduction is the main mode of heat transfer for solid materials because the strong inter-molecular forces allow the vibrations of particles to be easily transmitted, in comparison to liquids and gases. Liquids have weaker inter-molecular forces and more space between the particles, which makes the vibrations of particles harder to transmit. Gases have even more space, and therefore infrequent particle collisions. This makes liquids and gases poor conductors of heat.

Thermal contact conductance is heat conduction between solid bodies in contact. A temperature drop is often observed at the interface between the two surfaces. This phenomenon is a result of a thermal contact resistance between the contacting surfaces. Interfacial thermal resistance is an interface's resistance to thermal flow. This resistance differs from contact resistance, as it exists even at atomically perfect interfaces. Understanding the thermal resistance at the interface between two materials is of primary significance in the study of thermal properties. Interfaces often contribute significantly to the observed properties of the materials.

Inter-molecular energy transfer could be primarily by elastic impact, as in fluids, or by free-electron diffusion, as in metals, or phonon vibration, as in insulators. In insulators, the heat flux is carried almost entirely by phonon vibrations.

Metals (e.g., copper, platinum, gold, etc.) are typically good conductors. This is due to the way that metals bond chemically: metallic bonds (as opposed to covalent or ionic bonds) have free-moving electrons that transfer thermal energy rapidly. The electron fluid of a conductive metallic solid conducts heat flux through the solid. Phonon flux is present, but carries less energy. Electrons conduct electric current through conductive solids, and the thermal and electrical conductivities of most metals have about the same ratio. A good electrical conductor, such as copper, conducts heat well. Thermoelectricity is caused by the interaction of heat flux and electric current. Heat conduction within a solid is directly analogous to diffusion of particles within a fluid, absent fluid currents.

In gases, heat transfer occurs through diffusion of gas molecules. Without convection, which relates to a fluid or gas phase, thermal conduction through a gas phase is dependent on the composition and pressure of this phase, and in particular, the mean free path of gas molecules relative to the size of the gas gap, as given by the Knudsen number $K_n$.

To quantify the ease with which a particular medium conducts, engineers measure thermal conductivity, also known as the conductivity constant or conduction coefficient, k. In thermal conductivity, k is defined as "the quantity of heat, Q, transmitted in time (t) through a thickness (L), in a direction normal to a surface of area (A), due to a temperature difference (ΔT) [...]". Thermal conductivity is a material property that is primarily dependent on the medium's phase, temperature, density, and molecular bonding. Thermal effusivity is derived from conductivity, which is a measure of its ability to exchange thermal energy with its surroundings.

== Types ==
=== Steady-state conduction ===
Steady-state conduction is the form of conduction that happens when the temperature difference(s) driving the conduction are constant, so that (after an equilibration time), the spatial distribution of temperatures (temperature field) in the conducting object does not change any further. Thus, all partial derivatives of temperature concerning space may either be zero or have nonzero values, but all derivatives of temperature at any point concerning time are uniformly zero. In steady-state conduction, the amount of heat entering any region of an object is equal to the amount of heat coming out (if this were not so, the temperature would be rising or falling, as thermal energy was tapped or trapped in a region).

For example, a bar may be cold at one end and hot at the other, but after a state of steady-state conduction is reached, the spatial gradient of temperatures along the bar does not change any further, as time proceeds. Instead, the temperature remains constant at any given cross-section of the rod normal to the direction of heat transfer, and this temperature varies linearly in space in the case where there is no heat generation in the rod.

In steady-state conduction, all the laws of direct current electrical conduction can be applied to "heat currents". In such cases, it is possible to take "thermal resistances" as the analog to electrical resistances. In such cases, temperature plays the role of voltage, and heat transferred per unit time (heat power) is the analog of electric current. Steady-state systems can be modeled by networks of such thermal resistances in series and parallel, in exact analogy to electrical networks of resistors. See purely resistive thermal circuits for an example of such a network.

=== Transient conduction ===
During any period in which temperatures changes in time at any place within an object, the mode of thermal energy flow is termed transient conduction. Another term is "non-steady-state" conduction, referring to the time-dependence of temperature fields in an object. Non-steady-state situations appear after an imposed change in temperature at a boundary of an object. They may also occur with temperature changes inside an object, as a result of a new source or sink of heat suddenly introduced within an object, causing temperatures near the source or sink to change in time.

When a new perturbation of temperature of this type happens, temperatures within the system change in time toward a new equilibrium with the new conditions, provided that these do not change. After equilibrium, heat flow into the system once again equals the heat flow out, and temperatures at each point inside the system no longer change. Once this happens, transient conduction is ended, although steady-state conduction may continue if heat flow continues.

If changes in external temperatures or internal heat generation changes are too rapid for the equilibrium of temperatures in space to take place, then the system never reaches a state of unchanging temperature distribution in time, and the system remains in a transient state.

An example of a new source of heat "turning on" within an object, causing transient conduction, is an engine starting in an automobile. In this case, the transient thermal conduction phase for the entire machine is over, and the steady-state phase appears, as soon as the engine reaches steady-state operating temperature. In this state of steady-state equilibrium, temperatures vary greatly from the engine cylinders to other parts of the automobile, but at no point in space within the automobile does temperature increase or decrease. After establishing this state, the transient conduction phase of heat transfer is over.

New external conditions also cause this process: for example, the copper bar in the example steady-state conduction experiences transient conduction as soon as one end is subjected to a different temperature from the other. Over time, the field of temperatures inside the bar reaches a new steady-state, in which a constant temperature gradient along the bar is finally set up, and this gradient then stays constant in time. Typically, such a new steady-state gradient is approached exponentially with time after a new temperature-or-heat source or sink, has been introduced. When a "transient conduction" phase is over, heat flow may continue at high power, so long as temperatures do not change.

An example of transient conduction that does not end with steady-state conduction, but rather no conduction, occurs when a hot copper ball is dropped into oil at a low temperature. Here, the temperature field within the object begins to change as a function of time, as the heat is removed from the metal, and the interest lies in analyzing this spatial change of temperature within the object over time until all gradients disappear entirely (the ball has reached the same temperature as the oil). Mathematically, this condition is also approached exponentially; in theory, it takes infinite time, but in practice, it is over, for all intents and purposes, in a much shorter period. At the end of this process with no heat sink but the internal parts of the ball (which are finite), there is no steady-state heat conduction to reach. Such a state never occurs in this situation, but rather the end of the process is when there is no heat conduction at all.

The analysis of non-steady-state conduction systems is more complex than that of steady-state systems. If the conducting body has a simple shape, then exact analytical mathematical expressions and solutions may be possible (see heat equation for the analytical approach). However, most often, because of complicated shapes with varying thermal conductivities within the shape (i.e., most complex objects, mechanisms or machines in engineering) often the application of approximate theories is required, and/or numerical analysis by computer. One popular graphical method involves the use of Heisler Charts.

Occasionally, transient conduction problems may be considerably simplified if regions of the object being heated or cooled can be identified, for which thermal conductivity is very much greater than that for heat paths leading into the region. In this case, the region with high conductivity can often be treated in the lumped capacitance model, as a "lump" of material with a simple thermal capacitance consisting of its aggregate heat capacity. Such regions warm or cool, but show no significant temperature variation across their extent, during the process (as compared to the rest of the system). This is due to their far higher conductance. During transient conduction, therefore, the temperature across their conductive regions changes uniformly in space, and as a simple exponential in time. An example of such systems is those that follow Newton's law of cooling during transient cooling (or the reverse during heating). The equivalent thermal circuit consists of a simple capacitor in series with a resistor. In such cases, the remainder of the system with a high thermal resistance (comparatively low conductivity) plays the role of the resistor in the circuit.

=== Relativistic conduction ===
The theory of relativistic heat conduction is a model that is compatible with the theory of special relativity. For most of the last century, it was recognized that the Fourier equation is in contradiction with the theory of relativity because it admits an infinite speed of propagation of heat signals. For example, according to the Fourier equation, a pulse of heat at the origin would be felt at infinity instantaneously. The speed of information propagation is faster than the speed of light in vacuum, which is physically inadmissible within the framework of relativity.

=== Quantum conduction ===
Second sound is a quantum mechanical phenomenon in which heat transfer occurs by wave-like motion, rather than by the more usual mechanism of diffusion. Heat takes the place of pressure in normal sound waves. This leads to a very high thermal conductivity. It is known as "second sound" because the wave motion of heat is similar to the propagation of sound in air. This is called quantum conduction.

== Fourier's law ==
The law of heat conduction, also known as Fourier's law (compare Fourier's heat equation), states that the rate of heat transfer through a material is proportional to the negative gradient in the temperature and to the area, at right angles to that gradient, through which the heat flows. We can state this law in two equivalent forms: the integral form, in which we look at the amount of energy flowing into or out of a body as a whole, and the differential form, in which we look at the flow rates or fluxes of energy locally.

Newton's law of cooling is a discrete analogue of Fourier's law, while Ohm's law is the electrical analogue of Fourier's law and Fick's laws of diffusion is its chemical analogue.

=== Differential form ===
The differential form of Fourier's law of thermal conduction shows that the local heat flux density $\mathbf{q}$ is equal to the product of thermal conductivity $\kappa$ and the negative local temperature gradient $-\nabla T$. The heat flux density is the amount of energy that flows through a unit area per unit time.
$$\mathbf{q} = - \kappa \nabla T,$$
where (including the SI units)

- $\mathbf{q}$ is the local heat flux density, W/m^{2},
- $\kappa$ is the material's conductivity, W/(m·K),
- $\nabla T$ is the temperature gradient, K/m.

The thermal conductivity $k$ is often treated as a constant, though this is not always true. While the thermal conductivity of a material generally varies with temperature, the variation can be small over a significant range of temperatures for some common materials. In anisotropic materials, the thermal conductivity typically varies with orientation; in this case $\kappa$ is represented by a second-order tensor. In non-uniform materials, $\kappa$ varies with spatial location.

For many simple applications, Fourier's law is used in its one-dimensional form, for example, in the x direction:
$$q_x = - \kappa \frac{dT}{dx}.$$

In an isotropic medium, Fourier's law leads to the heat equation
$$\frac{\partial T}{\partial t} = \alpha\left(\frac{\partial^2T}{\partial x^2} + \frac{\partial^2T}{\partial y^2} + \frac{\partial^2T}{\partial z^2}\right)$$
with a fundamental solution famously known as the heat kernel.

=== Integral form ===
By integrating the differential form over the material's total surface $S$, we arrive at the integral form of Fourier's law:

$\scriptstyle S$ $\mathbf q \cdot \mathrm{d}\mathbf{S}$${}={}$$-\kappa$ $\scriptstyle S$ $\nabla T \cdot \mathrm{d}\mathbf{S}$

where (including the SI units):

- $\dot{Q}=$ $\scriptstyle S$ $\mathbf q \cdot \mathrm{d}\mathbf{S}$ is the thermal power transferred by conduction (in W), time derivative of the transferred heat $Q$ (in J),
- $\mathrm{d}\mathbf{S}$ is an oriented surface area element (in m^{2}).

The above differential equation, when integrated for a homogeneous material of 1-D geometry between two endpoints at constant temperature, gives the heat flow rate as
$$Q = -\kappa \frac{A\Delta t}{L} \Delta T,$$
where

- $\Delta t$ is the time interval during which the amount of heat $Q$ flows through a cross-section of the material,
- $A$ is the cross-sectional surface area,
- $\Delta T$ is the temperature difference between the ends,
- $L$ is the distance between the ends.

One can define the (macroscopic) thermal resistance of the 1-D homogeneous material:
$$R = \frac 1 k \frac L A$$

With a simple 1-D steady heat conduction equation which is analogous to Ohm's law for a simple electric resistance:
$$\Delta T= R \, \dot{Q}$$

This law forms the basis for the derivation of the heat equation.

== Conductance ==
Writing
$$U = \frac{k}{\Delta x},$$
where U is the conductance, in W/(m^{2} K).

Fourier's law can also be stated as:
$$\frac{\Delta Q}{\Delta t} = U A\, (-\Delta T).$$

The reciprocal of conductance is resistance, $\big. R$ is given by:
$$R = \frac{1}{U} = \frac{\Delta x}{k} = \frac{A\, (-\Delta T)}{\frac{\Delta Q}{\Delta t}}.$$

Resistance is additive when several conducting layers lie between the hot and cool regions, because A and Q are the same for all layers. In a multilayer partition, the total conductance is related to the conductance of its layers by:
$$R = R_1+ R_2 + R_3 + \cdots$$
or equivalently
$$\frac{1}{U} = \frac{1}{U_1} + \frac{1}{U_2} + \frac{1}{U_3} + \cdots$$

So, when dealing with a multilayer partition, the following formula is usually used:
$$\frac{\Delta Q}{\Delta t} = \frac{A\,(-\Delta T)}{\frac{\Delta x_1}{k_1} + \frac{\Delta x_2}{k_2} + \frac{\Delta x_3}{k_3}+ \cdots}.$$

For heat conduction from one fluid to another through a barrier, it is sometimes important to consider the conductance of the thin film of fluid that remains stationary next to the barrier. This thin film of fluid is difficult to quantify because its characteristics depend upon complex conditions of turbulence and viscosity—but when dealing with thin high-conductance barriers it can sometimes be quite significant.

=== Intensive-property representation ===
The previous conductance equations, written in terms of extensive properties, can be reformulated in terms of intensive properties. Ideally, the formulae for conductance should produce a quantity with dimensions independent of distance, like Ohm's law for electrical resistance, $R = V/I\,\!$, and conductance, $G = I/V \,\!$.

From the electrical formula: $R = \rho x / A$, where ρ is resistivity, x is length, and A is cross-sectional area, we have $G = k A / x \,\!$, where G is conductance, k is conductivity, x is length, and A is cross-sectional area.

For heat,
$$U = \frac{k A} {\Delta x},$$
where U is the conductance.

Fourier's law can also be stated as:
$$\dot{Q} = U \, \Delta T,$$
analogous to Ohm's law, $I = V/R$ or $I = V G .$

The reciprocal of conductance is resistance, R, given by:
$$R = \frac{\Delta T}{\dot{Q}},$$
analogous to Ohm's law, $R = V/I .$

The rules for combining resistances and conductances (in series and parallel) are the same for both heat flow and electric current.

=== Cylindrical shells ===
Conduction through cylindrical shells (e.g. pipes) can be calculated from the internal radius, $r_1$, the external radius, $r_2$, the length, $\ell$, and the temperature difference between the inner and outer wall, $T_2 - T_1$.

The surface area of the cylinder is $A_r = 2 \pi r \ell$

When Fourier's equation is applied:
$$\dot{Q} = -k A_r \frac{dT}{dr} = -2 k \pi r \ell \frac{dT}{dr}$$
and rearranged:
$$\dot{Q} \int_{r_1}^{r_2} \frac{1}{r} \, dr = -2 k \pi \ell \int_{T_1}^{T_2} dT$$
then the rate of heat transfer is:
$$\dot{Q} = 2 k \pi \ell \frac{T_1 - T_2}{\ln (r_2 /r_1)}$$
the thermal resistance is:
$$R_c = \frac{\Delta T}{\dot{Q}}= \frac{\ln (r_2 /r_1)}{2 \pi k \ell}$$
and $\dot{Q} = 2 \pi k \ell r_m \frac{T_1-T_2}{r_2-r_1}$, where $r_m = \frac{r_2-r_1}{\ln (r_2 /r_1)}$. This is the log-mean radius.

=== Spherical ===
The conduction through a spherical shell with internal radius, $r_1$, and external radius, $r_2$, can be calculated in a similar manner as for a cylindrical shell.

The surface area of the sphere is: $A = 4\pi r^2.$

Solving in a similar manner as for a cylindrical shell (see above) produces:
$$\dot{Q} = 4 k \pi \frac{T_1 - T_2}{1/{r_1}-1/{r_2}} = 4 k \pi \frac{(T_1 - T_2) r_1 r_2}{r_2-r_1}$$

== Transient thermal conduction ==
=== Interface heat transfer ===
The heat transfer at an interface is considered a transient heat flow. To analyze this problem, the Biot number is important to understand how the system behaves. The Biot number is determined by:
$$\text{Bi} = \frac{hL}{k}$$
The heat transfer coefficient $h$, is introduced in this formula, and is measured in
$$\mathrm{\frac{J}{m^{2} s K}}$$
. If the system has a Biot number of less than 0.1, the material behaves according to Newtonian cooling, i.e. with negligible temperature gradient within the body. If the Biot number is greater than 0.1, the system behaves as a series solution. however, there is a noticeable temperature gradient within the material, and a series solution is required to describe the temperature profile. The cooling equation given is:
$$q = -h \, \Delta T,$$
This leads to the dimensionless form of the temperature profile as a function of time:
$$\frac{T-T_f}{T_i - T_f} = \exp \left ( \frac{-hAt}{\rho C_p V} \right ).$$
This equation shows that the temperature decreases exponentially over time, with the rate governed by the properties of the material and the heat transfer coefficient. The heat transfer coefficient, h, is measured in $\mathrm{\frac{W}{m^2 K}}$, and represents the transfer of heat at an interface between two materials. This value is different at every interface and is an important concept in understanding heat flow at an interface.

The series solution can be analyzed with a nomogram. A nomogram has a relative temperature as the y coordinate and the Fourier number, which is calculated by
$$\text{Fo}= \frac{\alpha t}{L^2}.$$

The Biot number increases as the Fourier number decreases. There are five steps to determine a temperature profile in terms of time.

1. Calculate the Biot number
2. Determine which relative depth matters, either x or L.
3. Convert time to the Fourier number.
4. Convert $T_i$ to relative temperature with the boundary conditions.
5. Compared required to point to trace specified Biot number on the nomogram.

== Applications ==
=== Splat cooling ===
Splat cooling is a method for quenching small droplets of molten materials by rapid contact with a cold surface. The particles undergo a characteristic cooling process, with the heat profile at $t=0$ for initial temperature as the maximum at $x=0$ and $T = 0$ at $x = -\infin$ and $x = \infin$, and the heat profile at $t=\infin$ for $-\infin \le x \le \infin$ as the boundary conditions. Splat cooling rapidly ends in a steady state temperature, and is similar in form to the Gaussian diffusion equation. The temperature profile, with respect to the position and time of this type of cooling, varies with:
$$T(x,t) - T_i = \frac{T_i \Delta X}{2 \sqrt{\pi \alpha t}} \exp \left ( -\frac{x^2}{4 \alpha t} \right )$$

Splat cooling is a fundamental concept that has been adapted for practical use in the form of thermal spraying. The thermal diffusivity coefficient, represented as $\alpha$, can be written as $\alpha =\frac{k}{\rho C_p}$. This varies according to the material.

=== Metal quenching ===
Metal quenching is a transient heat transfer process in terms of the time temperature transformation (TTT). It is possible to manipulate the cooling process to adjust the phase of a suitable material. For example, appropriate quenching of steel can convert a desirable proportion of its content of austenite to martensite, creating a very hard and strong product. To achieve this, it is necessary to quench at the "nose" (or eutectic) of the TTT diagram. Since materials differ in their Biot numbers, the time it takes for the material to quench, or the Fourier number, varies in practice. In steel, the quenching temperature range is generally from 600 °C to 200 °C. To control the quenching time and to select suitable quenching media, it is necessary to determine the Fourier number from the desired quenching time, the relative temperature drop, and the relevant Biot number. Usually, the correct figures are read from a standard nomogram. By calculating the heat transfer coefficient from this Biot number, one can find a liquid medium suitable for the application.

== Zeroth law of thermodynamics ==
One statement of the so-called zeroth law of thermodynamics is directly focused on the idea of conduction of heat. Bailyn (1994) writes that "the zeroth law may be stated: All diathermal walls are equivalent".

A diathermal wall is a physical connection between two bodies that allows the passage of heat between them. Bailyn is referring to diathermal walls that exclusively connect two bodies, especially conductive walls.

This statement of the "zeroth law" belongs to an idealized theoretical discourse, and actual physical walls may have peculiarities that do not conform to its generality.

For example, the material of the wall must not undergo a phase transition, such as evaporation or fusion, at the temperature at which it must conduct heat. But when only thermal equilibrium is considered and time is not urgent, so that the conductivity of the material does not matter too much, one suitable heat conductor is as good as another. Conversely, another aspect of the zeroth law is that, subject again to suitable restrictions, a given diathermal wall is indifferent to the nature of the heat bath to which it is connected. For example, the glass bulb of a thermometer acts as a diathermal wall whether exposed to a gas or a liquid, provided that they do not corrode or melt it.

These differences are among the defining characteristics of heat transfer. In a sense, they are symmetries of heat transfer.

== Instruments ==
=== Thermal conductivity analyzer ===
Thermal conduction property of any gas under standard conditions of pressure and temperature is a fixed quantity. This property of a known reference gas or known reference gas mixtures can, therefore, be used for certain sensory applications, such as the thermal conductivity analyzer.

The working of this instrument is by principle based on the Wheatstone bridge containing four filaments whose resistances are matched. Whenever a certain gas is passed over such network of filaments, their resistance changes due to the altered thermal conductivity of the filaments and thereby changing the net voltage output from the Wheatstone Bridge. This voltage output will be correlated with the database to identify the gas sample.

=== Gas sensor ===
The principle of thermal conductivity of gases can also be used to measure the concentration of a gas in a binary mixture of gases.

Working: if the same gas is present around all the Wheatstone bridge filaments, then the same temperature is maintained in all the filaments and hence same resistances are also maintained; resulting in a balanced Wheatstone bridge. However, If the dissimilar gas sample (or gas mixture) is passed over one set of two filaments and the reference gas on the other set of two filaments, then the Wheatstone bridge becomes unbalanced. And the resulting net voltage output of the circuit will be correlated with the database to identify the constituents of the sample gas.

Using this technique many unknown gas samples can be identified by comparing their thermal conductivity with other reference gas of known thermal conductivity. The most commonly used reference gas is nitrogen; as the thermal conductivity of most common gases (except hydrogen and helium) are similar to that of nitrogen.

== See also ==
- List of thermal conductivities
- Electrical conduction
- Convection diffusion equation
- R-value (insulation)
- Heat pipe
- Fick's law of diffusion
- Relativistic heat conduction
- Churchill–Bernstein equation
- Fourier number
- Biot number
- False diffusion
- General equation of heat transfer
- Physical crystallography before X-rays
