= Cooling =

Transfer of heat out of an object

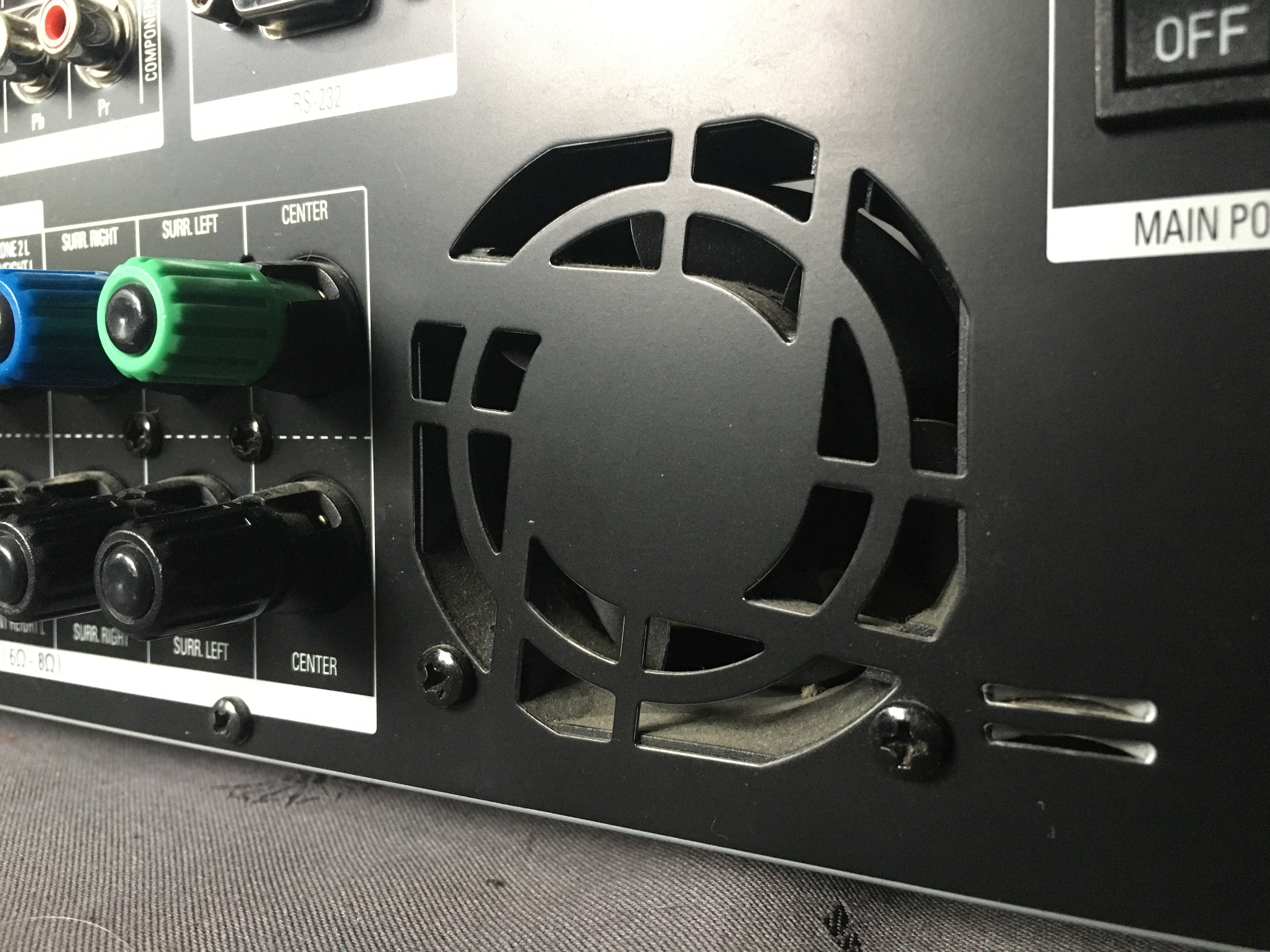
A cooling fan

Cooling is removal of heat, usually resulting in a lower temperature and/or phase change. Temperature lowering achieved by any other means may also be called cooling. The transfer of thermal energy may occur via thermal radiation, heat conduction or convection. Examples can be as simple as reducing temperature of tea.

== Devices ==
- Coolant
- Cooling towers, as used in large industrial plants and power stations
- Daytime passive radiative cooler

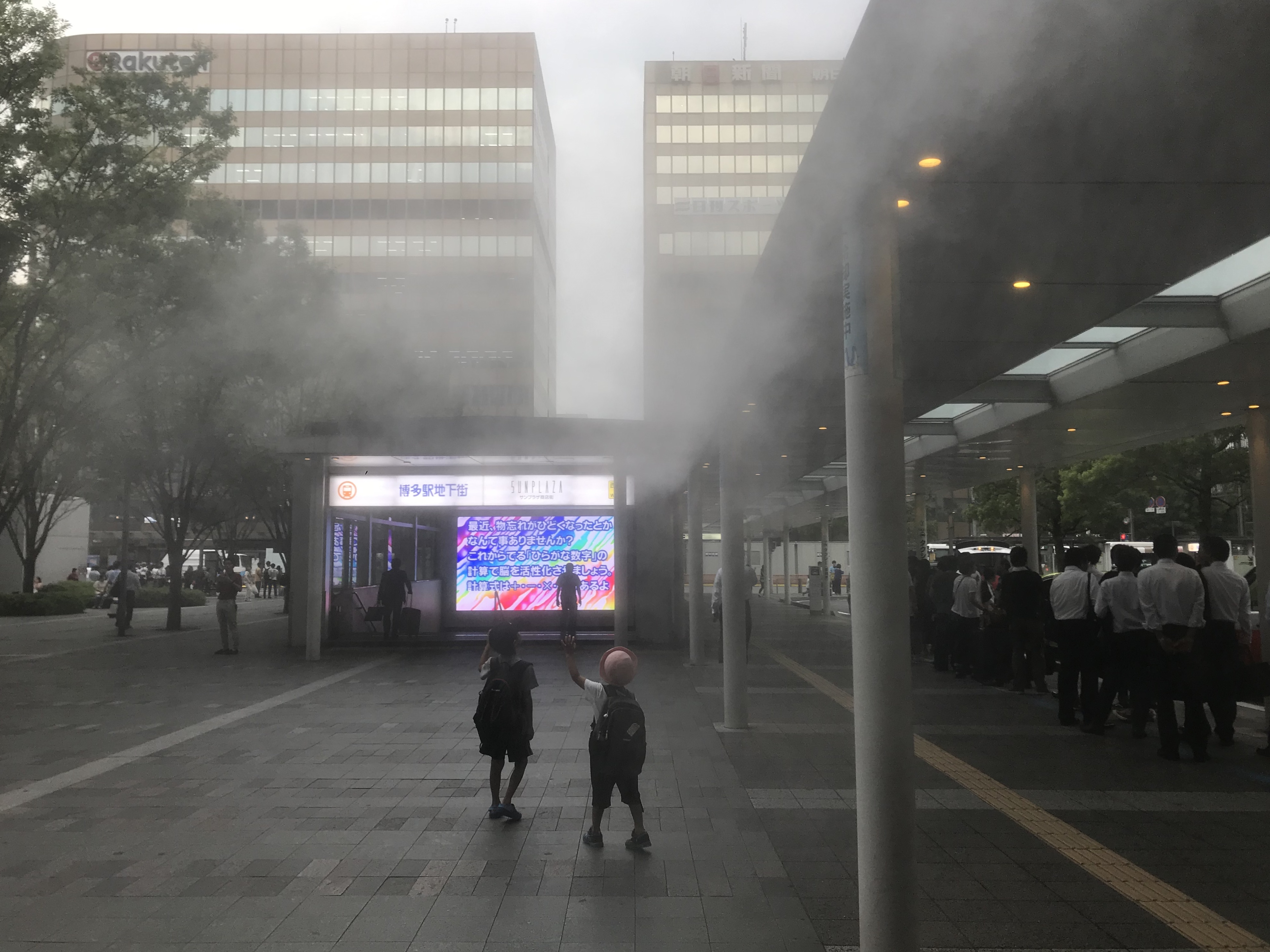
An evaporative cooler near Hakata Station in Fukuoka, Japan

- Evaporative cooler
- Heat exchanger
- Heat pipe
- Heat sink
- HVAC (Heating, Ventilation and Air Conditioning)
- Intercooler
- Radiative cooling in Heat shields
- Radiators in automobiles
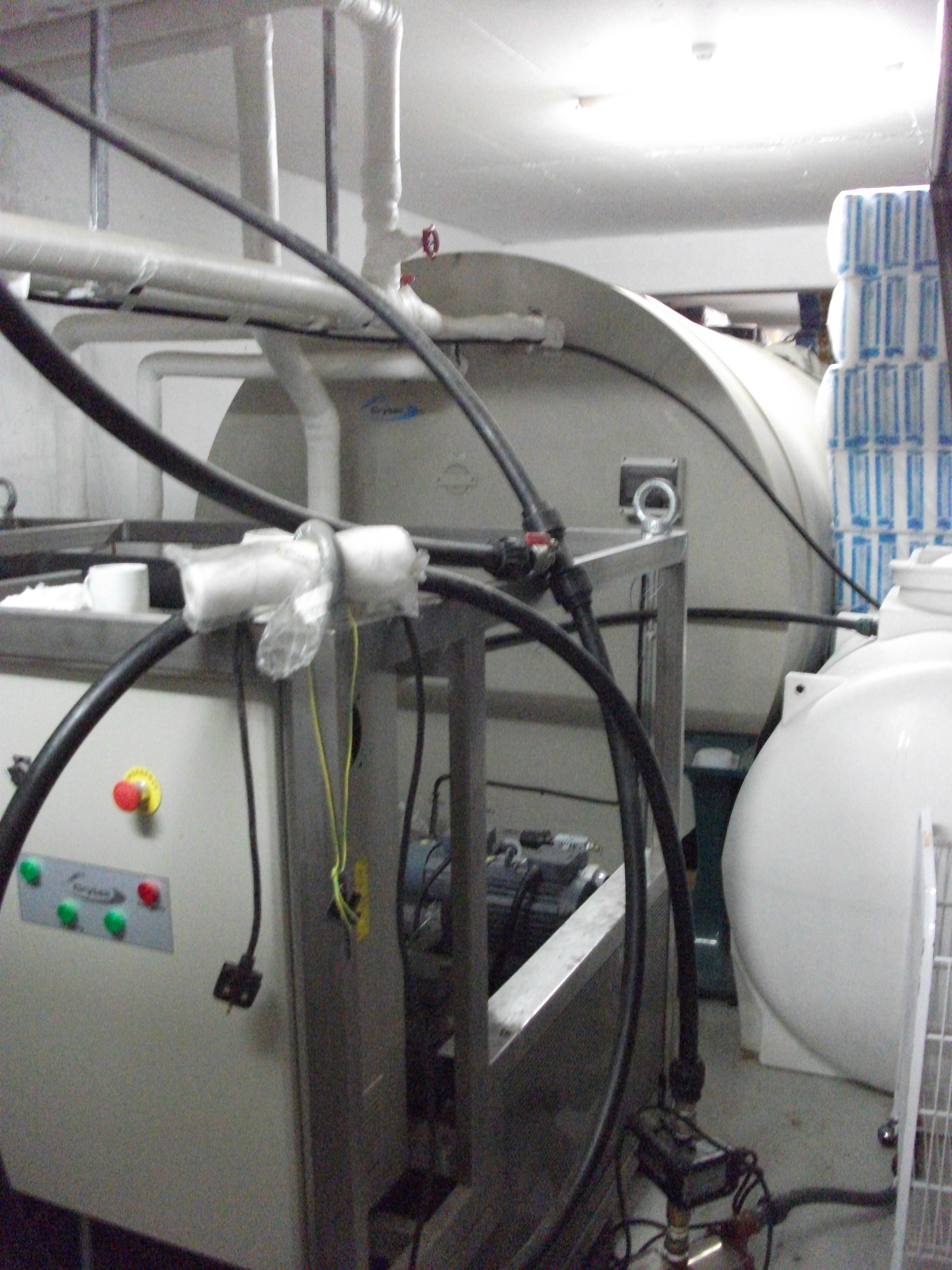
- Pumpable ice in the basement of a supermarket
  Pumpable ice technology
- Thermoelectric cooling
- Vortex tube, as used in industrial spot cooling

== See also ==
- Computer cooling
- Refrigeration
