= Soil thermal properties =

Energy transfer influence

The thermal properties of soil are a component of soil physics that has found important uses in engineering, climatology and agriculture. These properties influence how energy is partitioned in the soil profile. While related to soil temperature, it is more accurately associated with the transfer of energy (mostly in the form of heat) throughout the soil, by radiation, conduction and convection.

The main soil thermal properties are

- Volumetric heat capacity, SI Units: J∙m^{−3}∙K^{−1}
- Thermal conductivity, SI Units: W∙m^{−1}∙K^{−1}
- Thermal diffusivity, SI Units: m^{2}∙s^{−1}

== Measurement ==
It is hard to say something general about the soil thermal properties at a certain location because these are in a constant state of flux from diurnal and seasonal variations. Apart from the basic soil composition, which is constant at one location, soil thermal properties are strongly influenced by the soil volumetric water content, volume fraction of solids and volume fraction of air. Air is a poor thermal conductor and reduces the effectiveness of the solid and liquid phases to conduct heat. While the solid phase has the highest conductivity it is the variability of soil moisture that largely determines thermal conductivity. As such soil moisture properties and soil thermal properties are very closely linked and are often measured and reported together. Temperature variations are most extreme at the surface of the soil and these variations are transferred to sub surface layers but at reduced rates as depth increases. Additionally there is a time delay as to when maximum and minimum temperatures are achieved at increasing soil depth (sometimes referred to as thermal lag).

One possible way of assessing soil thermal properties is the analysis of soil temperature variations versus depth Fourier's law,

$$Q = -\lambda dT/dz \,$$

where Q is heat flux or rate of heat transfer per unit area J·m^{−2}∙s^{−1} or W·m^{−2}, λ is thermal conductivity W·m^{−1}∙K^{−1}; dT/dz is the gradient of temperature (change in temp/change in depth) K·m^{−1}.

The most commonly applied method for measurement of soil thermal properties, is to perform in-situ measurements, using Non-Steady-State Probe systems, or Heat Probes.

=== Single and dual heat probes ===
The single probe method employs a heat source inserted into the soil whereby heat energy is applied continuously at a given rate. The thermal properties of the soil can be determined by analysing the temperature response adjacent to the heat source via a thermal sensor. This method reflects the rate at which heat is conducted away from the probe. The limitation of this device is that it measures thermal conductivity only. Applicable standards are: IEEE Guide for Soil Thermal Resistivity Measurements (IEEE Standard 442-1981) as well as with ASTM D 5334-08 Standard Test Method for Determination of Thermal Conductivity of Soil and Soft Rock by Thermal Needle Probe Procedure.

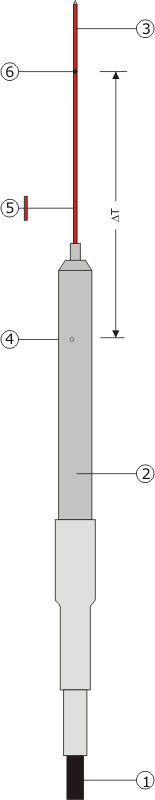
Small Size Non-Steady-State Probe: The probe consists of a needle (3) with a single thermocouple junction (6) and a heating wire, (5). It is inserted into the medium that is investigated.

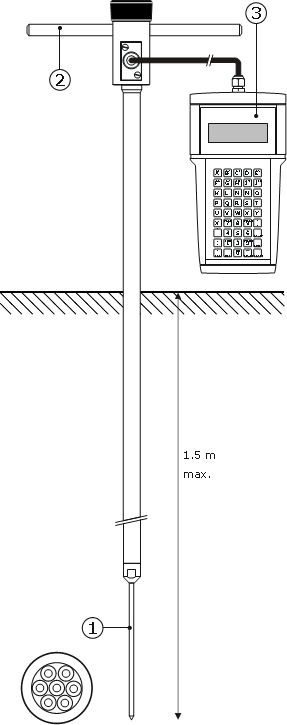
Example of a complete system for measurement of soil thermal conductivity, specially designed for measurements at around 1.5 meters below the soil surface, which is the typical depth of burial for high voltage cables.

After further research the dual-probe heat-pulse technique was developed. It consists of two parallel needle probes separated by a distance (r). One probe contains a heater and the other a temperature sensor. The dual probe device is inserted into the soil and a heat pulse is applied and the temperature sensor records the response as a function of time. That is, a heat pulse is sent from the probe across the soil (r) to the sensor. The great benefit of this device is that it measures both thermal diffusivity and volumetric heat capacity. From this, thermal conductivity can be calculated meaning the dual probe can determine all the main soil thermal properties. Potential drawbacks of the heat-pulse technique have been noted. This includes the small measuring volume of soil as well as measurements being sensitive to probe-to-soil contact and sensor-to-heater spacing.

=== Remote sensing ===
Remote sensing from satellites, aircraft has greatly enhanced how the variation in soil thermal properties can be identified and utilized to benefit many aspects of human endeavor. While remote sensing of reflected light from surfaces does indicate thermal response of the topmost layers of soil (a few molecular layers thick), it is thermal infrared wavelength that provides energy variations extending to varying shallow depths below the ground surface which is of most interest. A thermal sensor can detect variations to heat transfers into and out of near surface layers because of external heating by the thermal processes of conduction, convection, and radiation. Microwave remote sensing from satellites has also proven useful as it has an advantage over TIR of not being effected by cloud cover.

The various methods of measuring soil thermal properties have been utilized to assist in diverse fields such as; the expansion and contraction of construction materials especially in freezing soils, longevity and efficiency of gas pipes or electrical cables buried in the ground, energy conservation schemes, in agriculture for timing of planting to ensure optimum seedling emergence and crop growth, measuring greenhouse gas emissions as heat effects the liberation of carbon dioxide from soil. Soil thermal properties are also becoming important in areas of environmental science such as determining water movement in radioactive waste and in locating buried land mines.

== Uses ==
The thermal effusivity of soil enables the ground to be used for underground thermal energy storage. Solar energy can be recycled from summer to winter by using the ground as a long term store of heat energy before being retrieved by ground source heat pumps in winter.

Changes in the amount of dissolved organic carbon and soil organic carbon within the soil can affect its ability to respirate, either increasing or decreasing the soil's carbon uptake.

Furthermore, MCS design criteria for shallow loop ground source heat pumps require an accurate in situ thermal conductivity reading. This can be done by using the above-mentioned thermal heat probe to determine soil thermal conductivity across the site accurately.
