= Thermal effusivity =

Ability of a material to exchange energy with surroundings

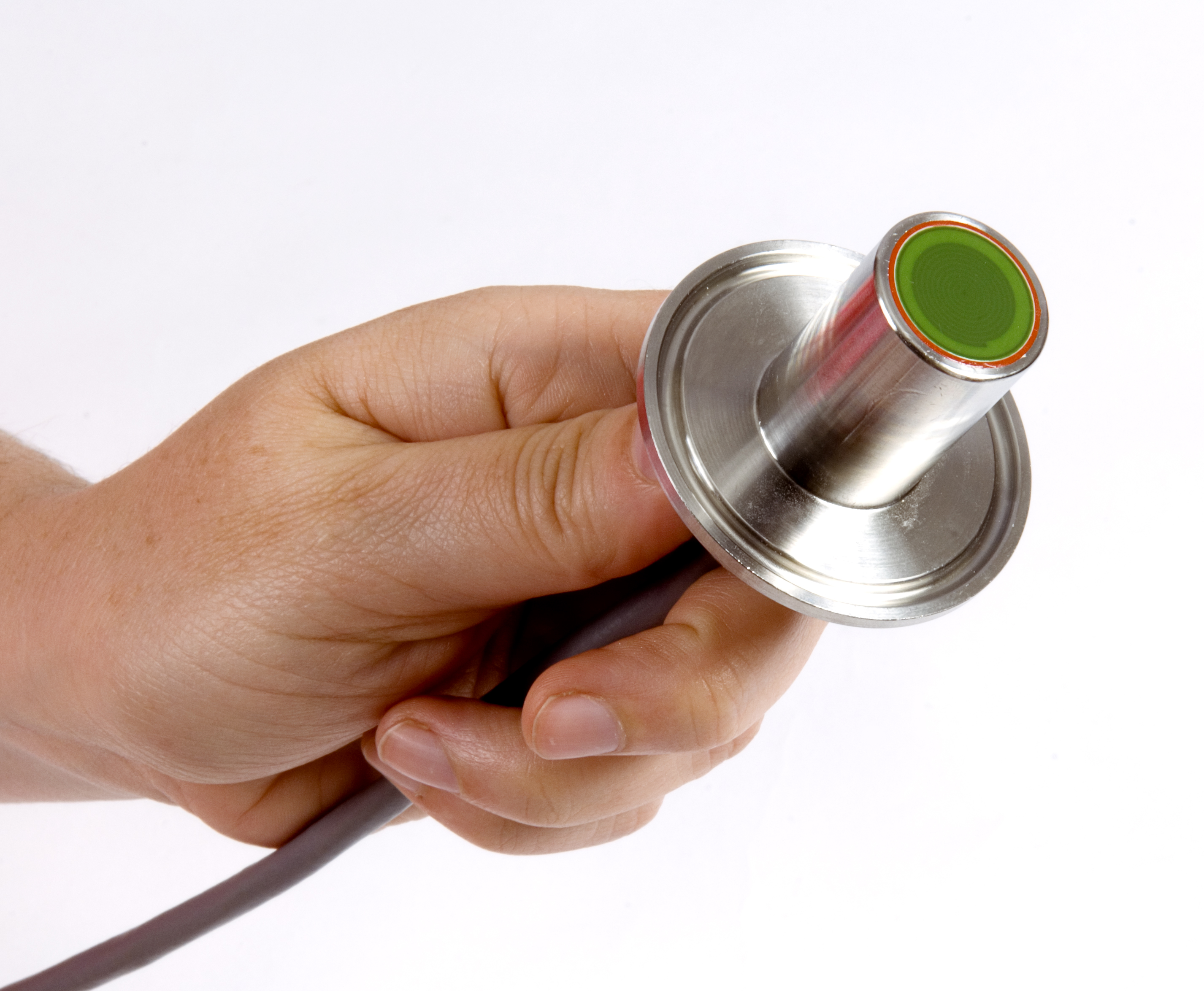
Thermal effusivity sensor typically used in the direct measurement of materials.

In thermodynamics, a material's thermal effusivity, also known as thermal responsivity, is a measure of its ability to exchange energy with its surroundings. It is an intensive quantity defined as the square root of the product of the material's thermal conductivity ($\lambda$) and its volumetric heat capacity ($\rho c_p$) or as the ratio of thermal conductivity to the square root of thermal diffusivity ($\alpha$).

$$e = \frac{\lambda}{\sqrt{\alpha}}=\sqrt{\lambda\rho c_p}.$$

Some authors use the symbol $r$ to denote the thermal effusivity. The SI units for thermal effusivity are ${\rm W} \sqrt{{\rm s}} / ({\rm m^2 K})$ or, equivalently, ${\rm J} / ( {\rm m^2 K}\sqrt{{\rm s}})$. Thermal effusivity can also be a measure of a solid or rigid material's thermal inertia.

Thermal effusivity is a parameter that emerges upon applying solutions of the heat equation to heat flow through a thin surface-like region. It becomes particularly useful when the region is selected adjacent to a material's actual surface. Knowing the effusivity and equilibrium temperature of each of two material bodies then enables an estimate of their interface temperature $T_m$ when placed into thermal contact. If $T_1$ and $T_2$ are the temperature of the two bodies, then upon contact, the temperature of the contact interface (assumed to be a smooth surface) becomes

$$T_m = \frac{e_1 T_1 + e_2 T_2}{e_1+e_2}$$

Specialty sensors have also been developed based on this relationship to measure effusivity.

Thermal effusivity and thermal diffusivity are related quantities, respectively a product versus a ratio of a material's intensive heat transport and storage properties. The diffusivity appears explicitly in the heat equation, which is an energy conservation equation, and measures the speed at which thermal equilibrium can be reached by a body. By contrast, a body's effusivity (also sometimes called inertia, accumulation, responsiveness, etc.) is its ability to resist a temperature change when subjected to a time-periodic or similarly perturbative forcing function.

== Applications ==
=== Temperature at a contact surface ===
If two semi-infinite (Note: i.e. their thermal capacity is sufficiently large that their temperatures will not change measurably owing to this heat transfer) bodies initially at temperatures $T_1$ and $T_2$ are brought in perfect thermal contact, the temperature at the contact surface $T_m$ will be a weighted mean based on their relative effusivities. This relationship can be demonstrated with a very simple "control volume" back-of-the-envelope calculation:

Consider the following 1D heat conduction problem. Region 1 is material 1, initially at uniform temperature $T_1$, and region 2 is material 2, initially at uniform temperature $T_2$. Given some period of time $\Delta t$ after being brought into contact, heat will have diffused across the boundary between the two materials. The thermal diffusivity of a material is $\alpha = \lambda/(\rho c_p)$. From the heat equation (or diffusion equation), a characteristic diffusion length $\Delta x_1$ into material 1 is

$\Delta x_1 \simeq \sqrt{\alpha_1 \cdot \Delta t}$, where $\alpha_1 = \lambda_1 / (\rho c_p)_1$.

Similarly, a characteristic diffusion length $\Delta x_2$ into material 2 is

$\Delta x_2 \simeq \sqrt{\alpha_2 \cdot \Delta t}$, where $\alpha_2 = \lambda_2 / (\rho c_p)_2$.

Assume that the temperature within the characteristic diffusion length on either side of the boundary between the two materials is uniformly at the contact temperature $T_m$ (this is the essence of a control-volume approach). Conservation of energy dictates that

$$\Delta x_1 (\rho c_p)_1 (T_1 - T_m) = \Delta x_2 (\rho c_p)_2 ( T_m - T_2 )$$.

Substitution of the expressions above for $\Delta x_1$ and $\Delta x_2$ and elimination of $\Delta t$ yields an expression for the contact temperature.

$$T_m = T_1 + \left(T_2 - T_1\right)\frac{e_2}{e_2 + e_1}=\frac{e_1 T_1 + e_2 T_2}{e_1+e_2}$$

This expression is valid for all times for semi-infinite bodies in perfect thermal contact. It is also a good first guess for the initial contact temperature for finite bodies.

Even though the underlying heat equation is parabolic and not hyperbolic (i.e. it does not support waves), if we in some rough sense allow ourselves to think of a temperature jump as two materials are brought into contact as a "signal", then the transmission of the temperature signal from 1 to 2 is $e_1 / (e_1 + e_2)$. Clearly, this analogy must be used with caution; among other caveats, it only applies in a transient sense, to media which are large enough (or time scales short enough) to be considered effectively infinite in extent.

=== Heat sensed by human skin ===
An application of thermal effusivity is the quasi-qualitative measurement of coolness or warmth "feel" of materials, also known as thermoception. It is a particularly important metric for textiles, fabrics, and building materials. Rather than temperature, skin thermoreceptors are highly responsive to the inward or outward flow of heat. Thus, despite having similar temperatures near room temperature, a high effusivity metal object is detected as cool while a low effusivity fabric is sensed as being warmer.

=== Diathermal walls ===
For a diathermal wall having a stepped "constant heat" boundary condition imposed at $t=0$ onto one side, thermal effusivity $e$ performs nearly the same role in limiting the initial dynamic thermal response (rigorously, during times less than the heat diffusion time to transit the wall) as the insulation U-factor $U$ plays in defining the static temperature obtained by the side after a long time. A dynamic U-factor $U_{dyn}$ and a diffusion time $t_L$ for the wall of thickness $L$, thermal diffusivity $\alpha$ and thermal conductivity $\lambda$ are specified by:

$U_{dyn}(t) = e\sqrt{\frac{\pi}{4t}} \approx \frac{e}{\sqrt{t}}$ ; during $0 < t < t_{L} = \frac{L^2}{4\pi\alpha}=\frac{e^2}{4\pi U^2}$ where $e= \frac{\lambda}{\sqrt{\alpha}}$ and $U = \frac{\lambda}{L}.$

=== Planetary science ===
For planetary surfaces, thermal inertia is a key phenomenon controlling the diurnal and seasonal surface temperature variations. The thermal inertia of a terrestrial planet such as Mars can be approximated from the thermal effusivity of its near-surface geologic materials. In remote sensing applications, thermal inertia represents a complex combination of particle size, rock abundance, bedrock outcropping and the degree of induration (i.e. thickness and hardness).

A rough approximation to thermal inertia is sometimes obtained from the amplitude of the diurnal temperature curve (i.e. maximum minus minimum surface temperature). The temperature of a material with low thermal effusivity changes significantly during the day, while the temperature of a material with high thermal effusivity does not change as drastically. Deriving and understanding the thermal inertia of the surface can help to recognize small-scale features of that surface. In conjunction with other data, thermal inertia can help to characterize surface materials and the geologic processes responsible for forming these materials.

On Earth, thermal inertia of the global ocean is a major factor influencing climate inertia. Ocean thermal inertia is much greater than land inertia because of convective heat transfer, especially through the upper mixed layer. The thermal effusivities of stagnant and frozen water underestimate the vast thermal inertia of the dynamic and multi-layered ocean.

=== Thermographic inspection ===
Thermographic inspection encompasses a variety of nondestructive testing methods that utilize the transient characteristics of heat propagation through a transfer medium. These methods include Pulse-echo thermography and thermal wave imaging, which utilize mixtures of heat diffusion and infrared em wave transport. Thermal effusivity and diffusivity of the materials being inspected can serve to simplify the mathematical modelling of, and thus interpretation of results from these techniques.

== Measurement interpretation ==
When a material is measured from the surface with short test times by any transient method or instrument, the heat transfer mechanisms generally include thermal conduction, convection, radiation and phase changes. The diffusive process of conduction may dominate the thermal behavior of solid bodies near and below room temperature.

A contact resistance (due to surface roughness, oxidation, impurities, etc.) between the sensor and sample may also exist. Evaluations with high heat dissipation (driven by large temperature differentials) can likewise be influenced by an interfacial thermal resistance. All of these factors, along with the body's finite dimensions, must be considered during execution of measurements and interpretation of results.

== Thermal effusivity of selected materials and substances ==
This is a list of the thermal effusivity of some common substances, evaluated at room temperature unless otherwise indicated.

List of thermal effusivities
Material	Thermal effusivity $\frac{{\rm kJ}}{ {\rm m^2 K}\sqrt{{\rm s}}}$	References
Air *	0.006	
Wool	0.07	
Cork	0.1	
Balsa Wood	0.26	
Paper	0.3	
Pine Wood	0.36-0.66	
Plasterboard	0.38	
Soil	0.5-2.6	
Concrete cinderblock	0.59	
PVC - polyvinyl chloride	0.6	
Sand (dry)	0.63	
Brick	1.0-1.6	
Skin	1.0	
Quartz - fused silica	1.5	
Water *	1.6	
Concrete (dense)	2.0	
Granite	2.0-3.0	
Ice - solid H_{2}O	2.8	
Silicon	14.4	
Stainless steel 316	7.23	
Iron	15.9	
Aluminum	23.7	
Copper	36.9	

(*) minimal advection

== See also ==
- Thermal contact conductance
- Thermal diffusivity
- Heat equation
- Heat capacity
