= Insulation =

Insulation may refer to:

== Thermal ==
- Thermal insulation, use of materials to reduce rates of heat transfer
  - List of insulation materials
  - Building insulation, thermal insulation added to buildings for comfort and energy efficiency
    - Insulated siding, home siding that includes rigid foam insulation
    - Insulated glazing, a thermally insulating window construction
  - Insulated pipe, widely used for district heating and hot water supply in Europe
  - Insulated shipping container, a type of packaging used to ship temperature-sensitive products

== Electrical ==
- Insulator (electricity), the use of material to resist the electric current and magnetism
  - Insulating link, a device used on the hook of a crane
  - Insulation system, for wires used in generators, electric motors, transformers
- Myelination, electrical insulation of nerve cells

== Other uses ==
- Soundproofing, also known as acoustic insulation, any means of reducing the intensity of sound
- Insulated neighborhood, chromosomal loop structures

== See also ==
- Insolation or solar irradiance
- Insulator (disambiguation)
- Isolation (disambiguation)
