= Isolator =

Isolator may refer to:

- Isolator (EP), a 2006 EP by Two Hours Traffic
- The Isolator (helmet), a sensory protection device
- The Isolator, a 2015 Japanese light novel

== Electronics ==
- Isolator (microwave), a two-port device that transmits microwave power in one direction only
- Isolator switch, used in electrical circuits
- Barrier isolator, a device that provides a physical barrier between a laboratory technician and a work process
- Optical isolator, a directional device in optical fiber communications
- Opto-isolator, a directional device in electronics
- Vibration isolator, any of various devices to isolate connected parts of an assembly from each other's vibrations
  - Bushing (isolator), one type of vibration isolator

== See also ==
- Isolation (disambiguation)
- Insulator (disambiguation)
