= Thermal inertia =

Delayed temperature response

Thermal inertia is a term commonly used to describe the observed delays in a body's temperature response during heat transfers. The phenomenon exists because of a body's ability to both store and transport heat relative to its environment. Since the configuration of system components and modes of transport (e.g. conduction, convection, radiation, phase change) and energy storage (e.g. internal energy, enthalpy, latent heat) vary substantially between instances, there is no generally applicable mathematical expression of closed form for thermal inertia.

Bodies with relatively large mass and heat capacity typically exhibit slower temperature responses. However heat capacity alone cannot accurately quantify thermal inertia. Measurements of it further depend on how heat flows are distributed inside and outside a body, in accordance with system boundary conditions.

Whether thermal inertia is an intensive or extensive quantity depends upon context. Some authors have identified it as an intensive material property, for example in association with thermal effusivity. It has also been evaluated as an extensive quantity based upon the measured or simulated spatial-temporal behavior of a system during transient heat transfers. A time constant is then sometimes appropriately used as a simple parametrization for thermal inertia of a selected component or subsystem.

== Description ==
The thermal pulse induced by a stepped-temperature boundary illustrates the phenomenon of thermal inertia.

A thermodynamic system containing one or more components with large heat capacity indicates that dynamic, or transient, effects must be considered when measuring or modelling system behavior. Steady-state calculations, many of which produce valid estimates of heat flows and temperatures when reaching an equilibrium, nevertheless yield no information on the transition path towards such stable or metastable conditions. Nowadays the spatial-temporal behavior of complex systems can be precisely evaluated with detailed numerical simulation. In some cases a lumped system analysis can estimate a thermal time constant.

A larger heat capacity $C$ for a component generally means a longer time to reach equilibrium. The transition rate also occurs in conjunction with the component's internal $U_i$ and environmental $U_e$ heat transfer coefficients, as referenced over an interface area $A$. The time constant $\tau$ for an estimated exponential transition of the component's temperature will adjust as $C/(A \cdot U_e)$ under conditions which obey Newton's law of cooling; and when characterized by a ratio $U_e/U_i,$ or Biot number, much less than one.

Analogies of thermal inertia to the temporal behaviors observed in other disciplines of engineering and physics can sometimes be used with caution. In building performance simulation, thermal inertia is also known as the thermal flywheel effect, and the heat capacity of a structure's mass (sometimes called the thermal mass) can produce a delay between diurnal heat flow and temperature which is similar to the delay between current and voltage in an AC-driven RC circuit. Thermal inertia is less directly comparable to the mass-and-velocity term used in mechanics, where inertia restricts the acceleration of an object. In a similar way, thermal inertia can be a measure of heat capacity of a mass, and of the velocity of the thermal pulse which controls the surface temperature of a body.

== Thermal effusivity ==
For a semi-infinite rigid body where heat transfer is dominated by the diffusive process of conduction only, the thermal inertia response at a surface can be approximated from the material's thermal effusivity, also called thermal responsivity $r$. It is defined as the square root of the product of the material's bulk thermal conductivity and volumetric heat capacity, where the latter is the product of density and specific heat capacity:

$$r = \sqrt{k \rho c}$$

- $k$ is thermal conductivity, with unit W⋅m^{−1}⋅K^{−1}
- $\rho$ is density, with unit kg⋅m^{−3}
- $c$ is specific heat capacity, with unit J⋅kg^{−1}⋅K^{−1}

Thermal effusivity has units of a heat transfer coefficient multiplied by square root of time:

- SI units of W⋅m^{−2}⋅K^{−1}⋅s^{1/2} or J⋅m^{−2}⋅K^{−1}⋅s^{−1/2}.
- Non-SI units of kieffers: Cal⋅cm^{−2}⋅K^{−1}⋅s^{−1/2}, are also used informally in older references. (Note: Coined by the planetary geophysicist Hugh H. Kieffer.)

When a constant flow of heat is abruptly imposed upon a surface, $r$ performs nearly the same role in limiting the surface's initial dynamic "thermal inertia" response:

$$U_{dyn}(t) \approx \frac{r}{\sqrt{t}};   t > 0$$

as the rigid body's static heat transfer coefficient $U$ plays in determining the surface's steady-state temperature.

== See also ==
- List of thermodynamic properties
- Thermal analysis
- Seasonal lag
