= Insulated pipe =

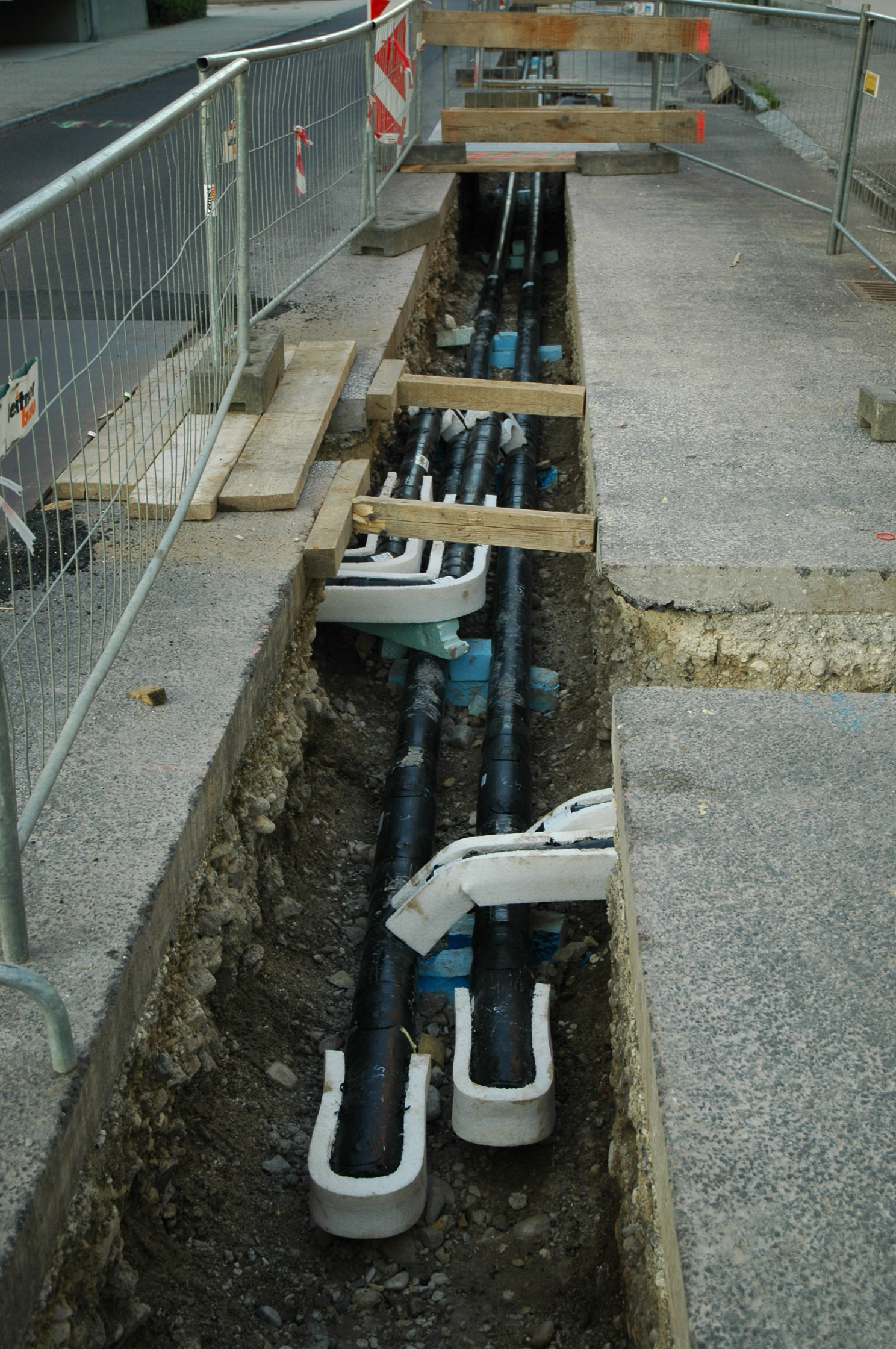
District heating pipeline from Lower Austria

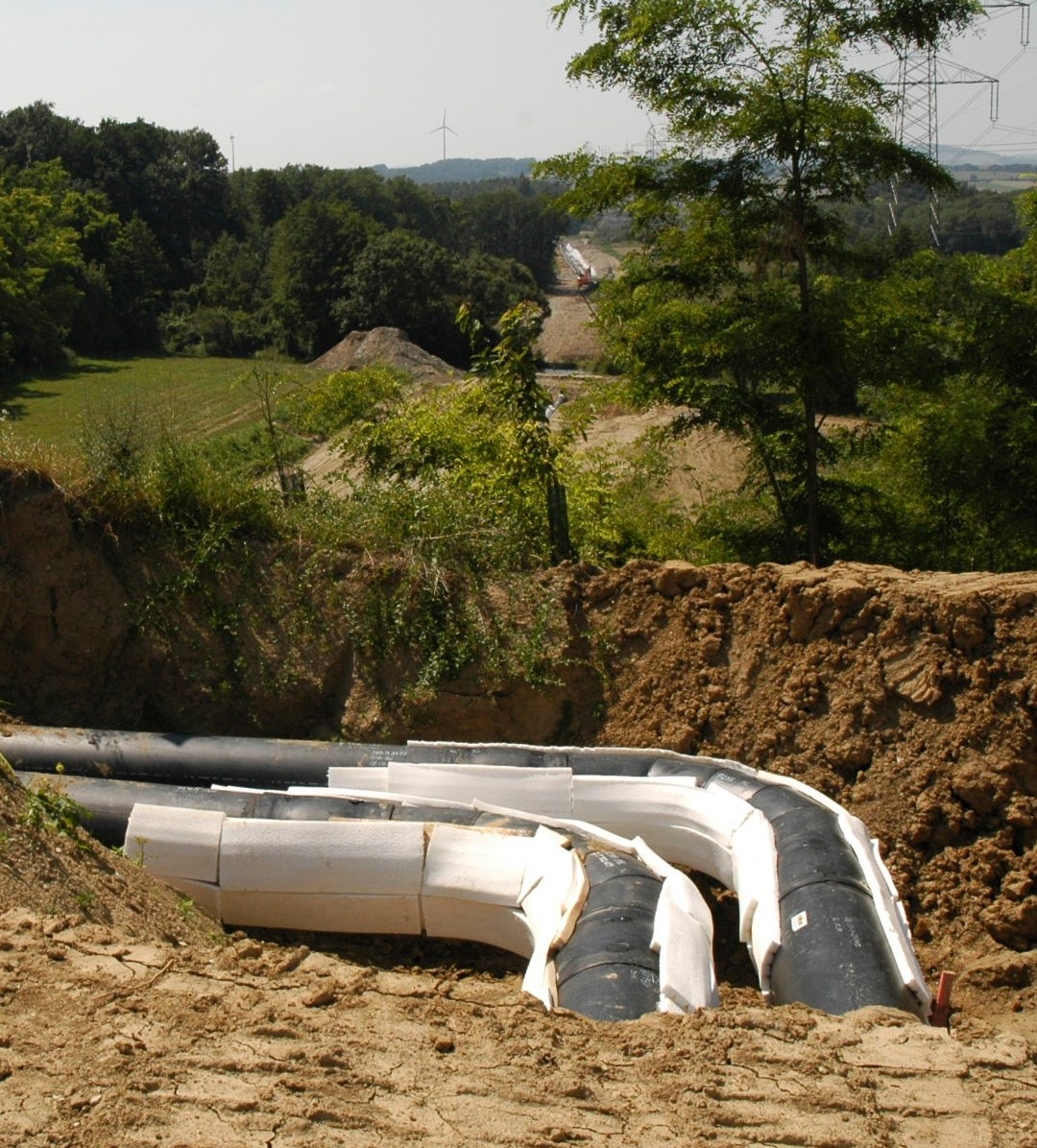
Elbow with foam pads of a District heating pipeline with a steel tube diameter of 400 mm installed in Lower Austria

Insulated pipes (called also preinsulated pipes or bonded pipe) are widely used for district heating and hot water supply. They consist of a steel pipe called "service pipe", a thermal insulation layer and an outer casing. The insulation bonds the service pipe and the casing together. The main purpose of such pipes is to maintain the temperature of the fluid inside the service pipes. Insulated pipes are commonly used for transport of hot water from district heating plants to district heating networks and for distribution of hot water inside district heating networks.

Thermal insulation material usually used is polyurethane foam or similar, with a thermal conductivity λ_{50} of about 0.024–0.033 W/(m·K). While polyurethane has outstanding mechanical and thermal properties, the high toxicity of the [diisocyanates] required for its manufacturing has caused a restriction on their use. This has triggered research on alternative insulating foam fitting the application, which include polyethylene terephthalate (PET) and polybutylene (PB-1). The outer casing is usually made of high-density polyethylene (HDPE). Preinsulated pipes for district heating are described in European standards EN 253 and EN 15698-1. EN 253 describes "District heating pipes - Bonded single pipe systems for directly buried hot water networks - Factory made pipe assembly of steel service pipe, polyurethane thermal insulation and a casing of polyethylene". EN 15698-1 describes "District heating pipes - Bonded twin pipe systems for directly buried hot water networks - Factory made twin pipe assembly of steel service pipes, polyurethane thermal insulation and one casing of polyethylene". Both standards don't give "short names" or abbreviations for described pipes.

According to EN 253:2019 & EN 15698-1:2019, pipes must be produced to work at constant temperature of 120 °C (248 °F) for 30 years. Thermal conductivity λ_{50} in unaged condition shall not exceed 0.029 W/(m·K). Both standards describe three insulation thickness levels. Both standards require use of polyurethane foam for thermal insulation and HDPE for casing.

Insulated pipelines are usually assembled from pipes of 6 metres (20 ft), 12 metres (39 ft), or 16 metres (52 ft) in length, directly buried in soil in depths of commonly 0.6–1.2 metres (2 ft 0 in – 3 ft 11 in).

== See also ==
- Heat conduction
- Heat transfer
- Heat transfer mechanisms
- R-value
- Specific Heat
- Thermal bridge
- Thermal contact conductance
- Thermal diffusivity
- Thermal resistance in electronics
- Thermocouple
