= Isolate =

Isolate may refer to:

== Arts, entertainment, and media ==
- Isolate (film), a 2013 Australian film
- Isolate (Circus Maximus album), 2007
- Isolate (Gary Numan album), 1992

== Language ==
- Isolating language, with near-unity morpheme/word ratio
- Language isolate, unrelated to any other

== Science and technology ==
- The product of isolation (microbiology), may be called:
  - an isolate;
    - specifically a fungal isolate;
  - a variant (biology);
  - or a strain (biology).
- Chemical isolate, from chemical purification
  - Protein isolate
- Genetic isolate, a population that does not mix with organisms of the same species
- Isolate (computation), in the Java Application Isolation API
- Primary isolate, a microbial sample from an infected individual

== See also ==
- Isolation (disambiguation)
