= Entrance length (fluid dynamics) =

Distance a flow travels after entering a pipe before fully developed

In fluid dynamics, the entrance length is the distance a flow travels after entering a pipe before the flow becomes fully developed. Entrance length refers to the length of the entry region, the area following the pipe entrance where effects originating from the interior wall of the pipe propagate into the flow as an expanding boundary layer. When the boundary layer expands to fill the entire pipe, the developing flow becomes a fully developed flow, where flow characteristics no longer change with increased distance along the pipe. Many different entrance lengths exist to describe a variety of flow conditions. Hydrodynamic entrance length describes the formation of a velocity profile caused by viscous forces propagating from the pipe wall. Thermal entrance length describes the formation of a temperature profile. Awareness of entrance length may be necessary for the effective placement of instrumentation, such as fluid flow meters.

== Hydrodynamic entrance length ==
The hydrodynamic entrance region refers to the area of a pipe where fluid entering a pipe develops a velocity profile due to viscous forces propagating from the interior wall of a pipe. This region is characterized by a non-uniform flow. The fluid enters a pipe at a uniform velocity, then fluid particles in the layer in contact with the surface of the pipe come to a complete stop due to the no-slip condition. Due to viscous forces within the fluid, the layer in contact with the pipe surface resists the motion of adjacent layers and slows adjacent layers of fluid down gradually, forming a velocity profile. For the conservation of mass to hold true, the velocity of layers of the fluid in the center of the pipe increases to compensate for the reduced velocities of the layers of fluid near the pipe surface. This develops a velocity gradient across the cross-section of the pipe.

=== Boundary layer ===
The layer in which the shearing viscous forces are significant, is called the boundary layer. This boundary layer is a hypothetical concept. It divides the flow in pipe into two regions:

1. Boundary layer region: The region in which viscous effects and the velocity changes are significant.
2. The irrotational (core) flow region: The region in which viscous effects and velocity changes are negligible, also known as the inviscid core.

When the fluid just enters the pipe, the thickness of the boundary layer gradually increases from zero moving in the direction of fluid flow and eventually reaches the pipe center and fills the entire pipe. This region from the entrance of the pipe to the point where the boundary layer covers the entire pipe is termed as the hydrodynamic entrance region and the length of the pipe in this region is termed the hydrodynamic entry length. In this region, the velocity profile develops and thus the flow is called the hydrodynamically developing flow. After this region, the velocity profile is fully developed and continues unchanged. This region is called the hydrodynamically fully developed region. But this is not the fully developed fluid flow until the normalized temperature profile also becomes constant.

In case of laminar flow, the velocity profile in the fully developed region is parabolic but in the case of turbulent flow it gets a little flatter due to vigorous mixing in radial direction and eddy motion.

The velocity profile remains unchanged in the fully developed region.

Hydrodynamic Fully Developed velocity profile Laminar Flow :

$$\frac{\partial u(r,x)} {\partial x}=0 \quad \Rightarrow u=u(r)$$

where $x$ is in the flow direction.

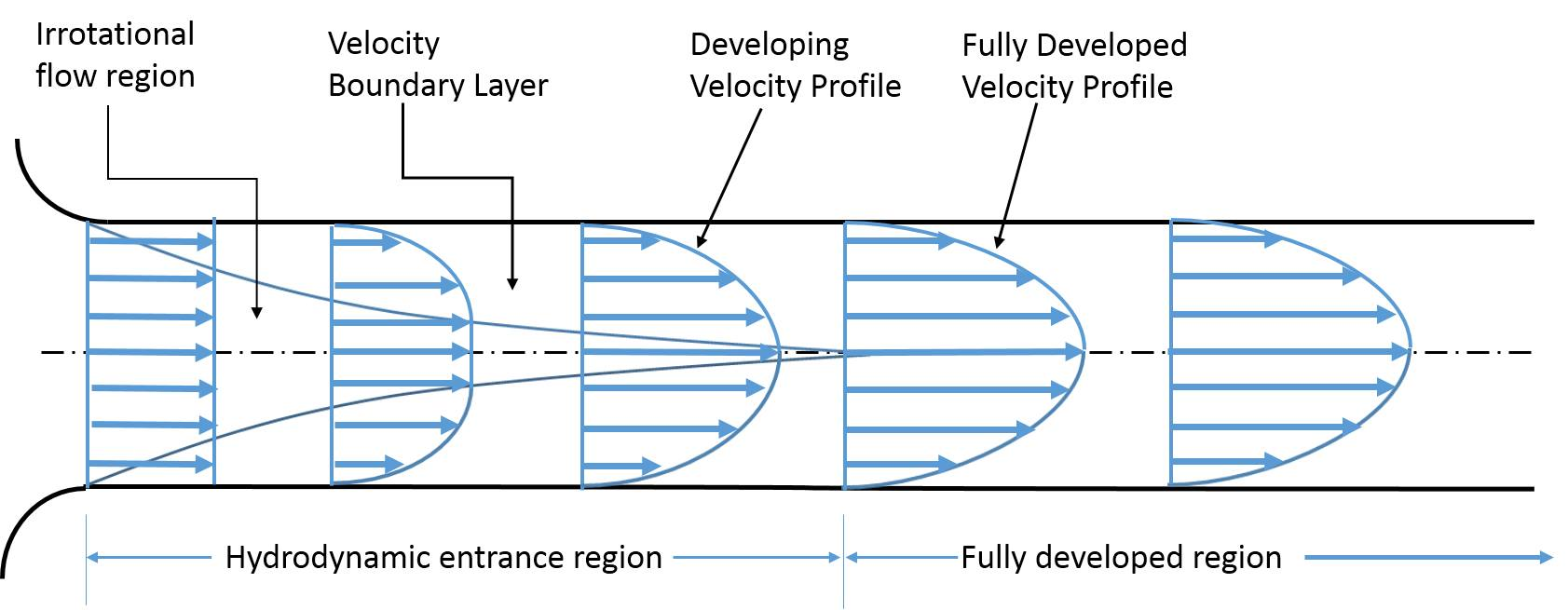
The developing velocity profile of a fluid entering a pipe.

=== Shear stress ===
In the hydrodynamic entrance region, the wall shear stress, $\tau_w$, is highest at the pipe inlet, where the boundary layer thickness is the smallest. Shear stress decreases along the flow direction. That is why the pressure drop is highest in the entrance region of a pipe, which increases the average friction factor for the whole pipe. This increase in the friction factor is negligible for long pipes. In a fully developed region, the pressure gradient and the shear stress in flow are in balance.

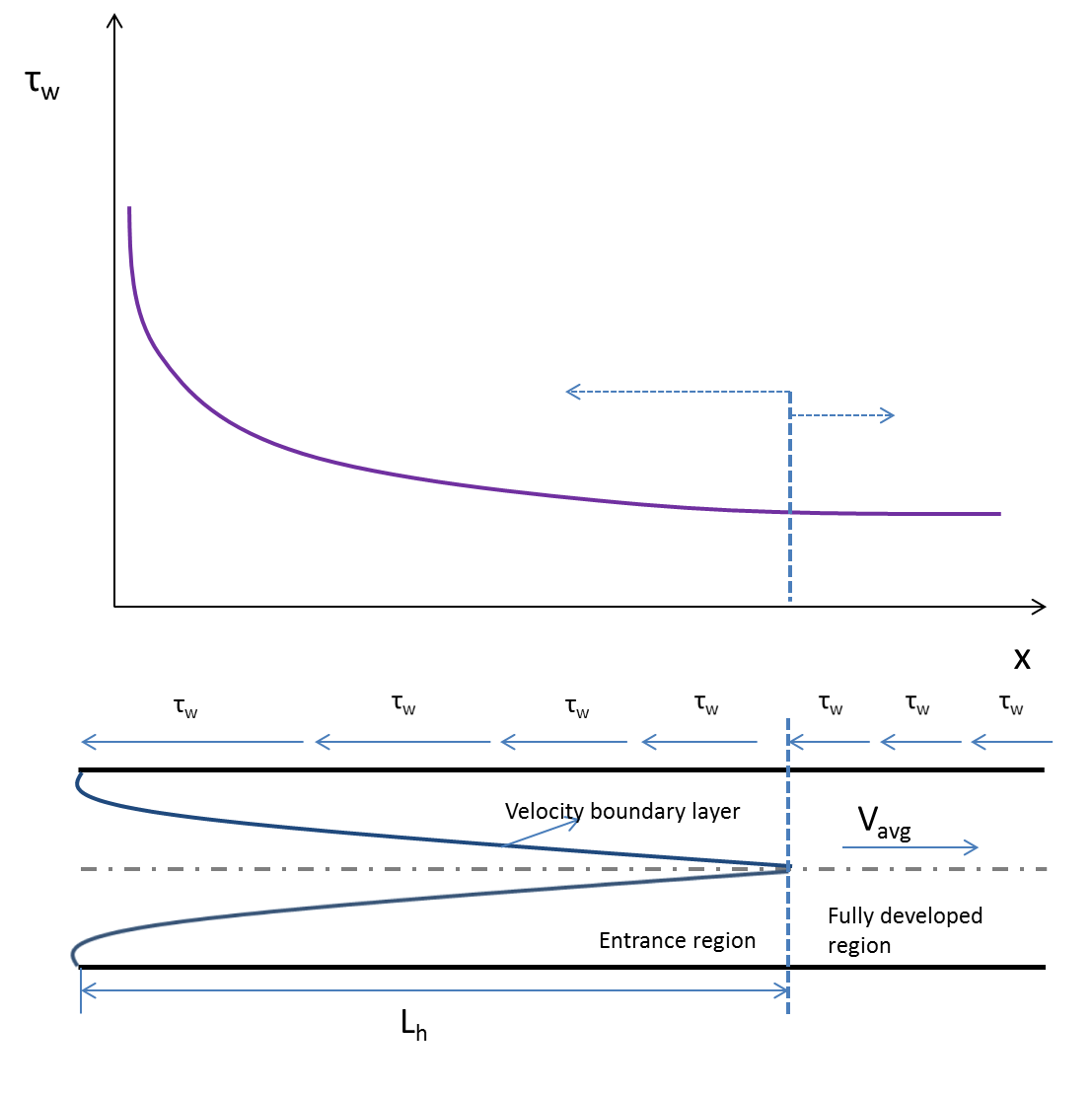
Variation of Shear Stress with distance from the entry point.

=== Calculating hydrodynamic entrance length ===
The length of the hydrodynamic entry region along the pipe is called the hydrodynamic entry length. It is a function of Reynolds number of the flow. In case of laminar flow, this length is given by:

$$L_{h,laminar} = 0.0575 Re_D D$$

where $R_e$ is the Reynolds number and $D$ is the diameter of the pipe.
But in the case of turbulent flow,

$$L_{h,turbulent} = 1.359 D (Re_D)^{1/4}.$$

Thus, the entry length in turbulent flow is much shorter as compared to laminar one. In most practical engineering applications, this entrance effect becomes insignificant beyond a pipe length of 10 times the diameter and hence it is approximated to be:

$$L_{h,turbulent}\approx 10D$$
Other authors give much longer entrance length, e.g.

- Nikuradse recommends $40D$ and
- Lien et al. recommend $150D$ for high Reynolds flows.

=== Entry length for pipes with non-circular cross-sections ===
In the case of a non-circular cross-section of a pipe, the same formula can be used to find the entry length with a little modification. A new parameter “hydraulic diameter” relates the flow in non-circular pipe to that of circular pipe flow. This is valid as long as the cross-sectional area shape is not too exaggerated. Hydraulic Diameter is defined as:

$$D_h=\frac{4A}{P}$$

where $A$ is the area of cross-section and $P$ is the Perimeter of the wet part of the pipe

=== Average velocity of fully developed flow ===
By doing a force balance on a small volume element in the fully developed flow region in the pipe (Laminar Flow), we get velocity as function of radius only i.e. it does not depend upon the axial distance from the entry point. The velocity as the function of radius comes out to be:

$$u(r)=- \frac{R^2}{4\mu} \frac{dP}{dx}\left(1-\frac{r^2}{R^2}\right)$$
where $\frac{\mathrm{d}P}{\mathrm{d}x}$ is constant.

By definition of average velocity is given by

$$V_{avg}=\frac{\int u \mathrm {d}A}{A_c}$$

where $A_c$ is cross-sectional area.

Thus,

$$\begin{align}
V_{avg} &= \frac{2}{R^2}\int_0^R u(r)r \mathrm {d}r\\
&=-\frac{2}{R^2}\int_0^R \frac{R^2}{4\mu}\frac{dP}{dx}(1-\frac{r^2}{R^2})r \mathrm{d}r\\
&=-\frac{R^2}{8\mu}\frac{dP}{dx}
\end{align}$$

For fully developed flow, the maximum velocity will be at $r=0$.
Thus,

$$U_{max}=2V_{avg}.$$

== Thermal entrance length ==
The thermal entrance length is the distance for incoming flow in a pipe to form a temperature profile with a stable shape. The shape of the fully developed temperature profile is determined by temperature and heat flux conditions along the inside wall of the pipe, as well as fluid properties.

=== Overview ===
Fully developed heat flow in a pipe can be considered in the following situation. If the wall of the pipe is constantly heated or cooled so that the heat flux from the wall to the fluid via convection is a fixed value, then the bulk temperature of the fluid steadily increases or decreases respectively at a fixed rate along the flow direction.

An example can be a pipe entirely covered by an electrical heating pad with the flow being introduced after a uniform heat flux from the pad is achieved. At some distance away from the entrance of the fluid, fully developed heat flow is achieved when the heat transfer coefficient of the fluid becomes constant and the temperature profile has the same shape along the flow. This distance is defined as the thermal entrance length, which is important for engineers to design efficient heat transfer processes.

=== Laminar flow ===
For laminar flow, the thermal entrance length is a function of pipe diameter and the dimensionless Reynolds number and Prandtl number.

$$\left(\frac{x_{fd,t}}{D}\right)_{laminar} \approx 0.05 Re_DPr$$

where

- $Re_D$ is the Reynolds number (based on the pipe diameter) and
- $Pr$ is the Prandtl number.

The Prandtl number modifies the hydrodynamic entrance length to determine thermal entrance length. The Prandtl number is the dimensionless number for the ratio of momentum diffusivity to thermal diffusivity. The thermal entrance length for a fluid with a Prandtl number greater than one will be longer than the hydrodynamic entrance length, and shorter if the Prandtl number is less than one. For example, molten sodium has a low Prandtl number of 0.004, so the thermal entrance length will be significantly shorter than the hydraulic entrance length.

For turbulent flows, thermal entrance length may be approximated solely based on pipe diameter.

$$\left(\frac{x_{fd,t}}{D}\right)_{turbulent} \approx 10$$

where

- $x_{fd,t}$ is the thermal entrance length and
- $D$ is the pipe inner diameter.

=== Heat transfer ===
The development of the temperature profile in the flow is driven by heat transfer determined conditions on the inside surface of the pipe and the fluid. Heat transfer may be a result of a constant heat flux or constant surface temperature. Constant heat flux may be caused by joule heating from a heat source, like heat tape, wrapped around the pipe. Constant temperature conditions may be produced by a phase transition, such as condensation of saturated steam on a pipe surface.

Newtons law of cooling describes convection, the main form of heat transport between the fluid and the pipe:

$$q''_s=h(T_s-T_m)$$

where

- $q''_s$ is the heat flux into the fluid,
- $h$ is the convection coefficient,
- $T_s$ is the surface temperature, and
- $T_m$ is the mean stream temperature.

Constant surface heat flux result in $T_s-T_m$becoming a constant as the flow develops and constant surface temperature results in $T_s-T_m$ approaching zero.

=== Thermally fully developed flow ===
Unlike hydrodynamic developed flow, a constant profile shape is used to define thermally fully developed flow because temperature continually approaches ambient temperature. Dimensionless analysis of change in profile shape defines when a flow is thermally fully developed.

Requirement for thermally fully developed flow:

$$\frac{\partial} {\partial x}\biggl(\frac{T_s-T}{T_s-T_m}\Biggr)_{fd,t}=0$$

Thermally developed flow results in reduced heat transfer compared to developing flow because the difference between the surface temperature of the pipe and the mean temperature of the flow is greater than the temperature difference between surface temperature of the pipe and the temperature of the fluid near the pipe boundary.

== Concentration entrance length ==
The concentration entrance length describes the length needed for the concentration profile in a flow to be fully developed. The concentration entrance length can be determined by relating it to the hydrodynamic entrance length with the Schmidt number or by experimental techniques. The Schmidt number describes the ratio of momentum diffusivity to mass diffusivity.

$$x_{fd,c} \approx 0.05 D Re_D Sc$$

where

- $x_{fd,c}$ is the concentration entrance length,
- $D$ is the pipe inner diameter,
- $Re_D$ is the Reynolds number (based on the pipe diameter), and
- $Sc$ is the Schmidt number.

== Applications ==
Understanding the entrance length is important for the design and analysis of flow systems. The entrance region will have different velocity, temperature, and other profiles than exist in the fully developed region of the pipe.

=== Flow meters ===
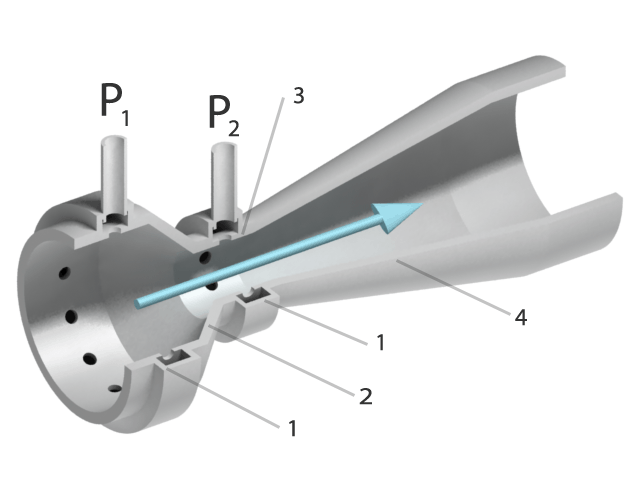
Illustration of a Venturi flow meter, an example of a differential-pressure flow meter.

Many types of flow instrumentation, such as flow meters, require a fully developed flow to function properly. Common flow meters, including vortex flow meters and differential-pressure flow meters, require hydrodynamically fully developed flow. Hydraulically fully developed flow is commonly achieved by having long, straight sections of pipe before the flow meter. Alternatively, flow conditioners and straightening devices may be used to produce the desired flow.

=== Wind tunnels ===
Wind tunnels use an inviscid flow of air to test the aerodynamics of an object. Flow straighteners, which consist of many parallel ducts which limit turbulence, are used to produce inviscid flow. Entrance length must be considered in the design of wind tunnels, because the object being tested must be located in the irrotational flow region, between the flow straighteners and the entrance length.

== Exit length ==
Similar to the development of flow at the entrance of the , the flow velocity profile changes before the exit of a pipe. The exit length is much shorter than the entrance length, and is not significant at moderate to high Reynolds numbers.

Hydraulic exit length for laminar flows may be approximated as:

$$\left(\frac{x}{D}\right)_{Lam} \approx
\begin{cases}
\frac{1}{2} & \text{Low } Re \\
0 & Re > 100
\end{cases}$$

where

- $x$ is the exit length,
- $D$ is the pipe inner diameter, and
- $Re$ is the Reynolds number.

== See also ==
- Fluid dynamics
- Heat transfer
- Laminar flow
- Thermal entrance length
- Turbulent flow
- Viscosity
