= HARBEC =

HARBEC manufactures prototypes, highly toleranced tooling, machined components, and injection molded parts. They produce engineered custom plastic parts for customers in the medical, automotive, electronic, telecommunications, consumer goods, and other industries. HARBEC performs initial design and concept molding; production tooling; low and high volume production injection molding and secondary processes.

HARBEC was initially established in 1977 as a contract tool and die/general machine shop. Currently, the 40,000sf facility is located just east of Rochester, in Ontario, NY. Its founder, Bob Bechtold, who expanded the business, claimed to pursue opportunities for innovation in the tool and die market. Although the company has continued to attempt to innovate, environmental concerns have also been an area of recent focus, as shown by features in various case studies.

== Environmental actions ==
HARBEC has been certified as an ISO9000 and ISO14000 company, demonstrating its use of “eco-economic” decisions and policies, designed to ensure that its activities are long-term sustainable. Further independent awards gained include the Energy Star Small Business award for significant efforts to reduce their environmental footprint. This is reflected in their slogan “technical innovation with environmental responsibility”.

HARBEC has developed and implemented new solutions to offset emissions, utilize waste and conserve resources. An example of this is their water conservation program. They have an 800,000 gallon reservoir for their fire suppression system and heat exchange equipment. Storm water and industrial waste water are diverted into the pond, where natural vegetation and cattail remediation are used to clean the water in which fish are raised. The pond provides thermal mass which is used to dissipate the heat prior to sending it to a cooling tower. This reduces the energy necessary for total cooling requirements.

HARBEC has a goal of "no carbon footprint by 2015". Currently, the facility has a 250 kW wind turbine and a twenty-five microturbine combined heat and power plant which generate electricity and provide the heating and cooling requirements of the facility.

Additional points include:

- Energy efficient equipment. All-electric presses have lowered energy costs by up to 50% and have increased processing speed and cycle time.
- Use of low-emissions transportation. The company owns hybrid, all electric, biodiesel, and compressed natural gas vehicles.
- Conversion of two of their turbines from natural gas to a liquid or gas biofuel.
- A lighting system upgrade which reduced the amount of energy used by 50%. This was accomplished by replacing existing lighting with T-8 type fluorescent bulbs and reflectors throughout the plant.
- Application of insulation to the barrels of every injection molding machine. This reduced 40-50% of the total process energy required for normal operation.
