= Interfacial thermal resistance =

Resistance to thermal flow between two materials

Interfacial thermal resistance, also known as thermal boundary resistance, or Kapitza resistance, is a measure of resistance to thermal flow at the interface between two materials. While these terms may be used interchangeably, Kapitza resistance technically refers to an atomically perfect, flat interface whereas thermal boundary resistance is a more broad term. This thermal resistance differs from contact resistance (not to be confused with electrical contact resistance) because it exists even at atomically perfect interfaces. Owing to differences in electronic and vibrational properties in different materials, when an energy carrier (phonon or electron, depending on the material) attempts to traverse the interface, it will scatter at the interface. The probability of transmission after scattering will depend on the available energy states on side 1 and side 2 of the interface.

Assuming a constant thermal flux is applied across an interface, this interfacial thermal resistance will lead to a finite temperature discontinuity at the interface. From an extension of Fourier's law, we can write

$Q = \frac{\Delta T}{R} = G \Delta T$

where $Q$ is the applied flux, $\Delta T$ is the observed temperature drop, $R$ is the thermal boundary resistance, and $G$ is its inverse, or thermal boundary conductance.

Understanding the thermal resistance at the interface between two materials is of primary significance in the study of its thermal properties. Interfaces often contribute significantly to the observed properties of the materials. This is even more critical for nanoscale systems where interfaces could significantly affect the properties relative to bulk materials.

Low thermal resistance at interfaces is technologically important for applications where very high heat dissipation is necessary. This is of particular concern to the development of microelectronic semiconductor devices as defined by the International Technology Roadmap for Semiconductors in 2004 where an 8 nm feature size device is projected to generate up to 100000 W/cm^{2} and would need efficient heat dissipation of an anticipated die level heat flux of 1000 W/cm^{2} which is an order of magnitude higher than current devices. On the other hand, applications requiring good thermal isolation such as jet engine turbines would benefit from interfaces with high thermal resistance. This would also require material interfaces which are stable at very high temperature. Examples are metal-ceramic composites which are currently used for these applications. High thermal resistance can also be achieved with multilayer systems.

As stated above, thermal boundary resistance is due to carrier scattering at an interface. The type of carrier scattered will depend on the materials governing the interfaces. For example, at a metal-metal interface, electron scattering effects will dominate thermal boundary resistance, as electrons are the primary thermal energy carriers in metals.

Two widely used predictive models are the acoustic mismatch model (AMM) and the diffuse mismatch model (DMM). The AMM assumes a geometrically perfect interface and phonon transport across it is entirely elastic, treating phonons as waves in a continuum. On the other hand, the DMM assumes scattering at the interface is diffusive, which is accurate for interfaces with characteristic roughness at elevated temperatures.

Molecular dynamics (MD) simulations are a powerful tool to investigate interfacial thermal resistance. Recent MD studies have demonstrated that the solid-liquid interfacial thermal resistance is reduced on nanostructured solid surfaces by enhancing the solid-liquid interaction energy per unit area, and reducing the difference in vibrational density of states between solid and liquid.

== Theoretical models ==
The primary model that has historically described Kapitza resistance is the phonon gas model. Within this model are the acoustic mismatch and diffuse mismatch models (AMM and DMM respectively). For both models the interface is assumed to behave exactly as the bulk on either side of the interface (e.g. bulk phonon dispersions, velocities, etc.), with hybrid vibrational modes and the phonons that occupy them being completely neglected. In addition, the AMM and DMM models are based only on elastic phonon transport, usually ignoring electrical contributions, although it is possible to take electron contributions into account within the phonon gas model. The AMM and DMM models should apply for interfaces where at least one of the materials is electrically insulating. The thermal resistance then results from the transfer of phonons across the interface. Energy is transferred when higher energy phonons which exist in higher density in the hotter material propagate to the cooler material, which in turn transmits lower energy phonons, creating a net energy flux.

According to the AMM and DMM models, a crucial factor in determining the thermal resistance at an interface is the overlap of phonon states. Specifically, the models completely disregard the effects of inelastic scattering and multiple phonon interactions. For example, the models only allow for a phonon occupying a particular mode frequency to interact with another phonon occupying a mode of exactly the same frequency. In reality, however, this is not the case and the interaction probability of two phonons can be calculated using perturbation theory (quantum mechanics). As an example within the AMM and DMM models, given two materials A and B, if material A has a low population (or no population) of phonons with certain k value, there will be very few phonons of that wavevector (or equivalently, frequency) to propagate from A to B. Likewise, due to the principle of detailed balance, AMM and DMM predict that very few phonons of that wavevector will propagate in the opposite direction, from B to A, even if material B has a large population of phonons with that wavevector. Thus as the overlap between phonon dispersions is small, there are fewer modes to allow for heat transfer in the material, giving at a high thermal interfacial resistance relative to materials with a high degree of overlap. Neither model is very effective for predicting the thermal interface resistance (with the exception of very low temperature), but rather for most materials they act as upper and lower limits for real behavior.

The AMM and DMM differ in the conditions they require for propagation across the interface, because the models differ greatly in their treatment of scattering at the interface. In AMM the interface is assumed to be perfect, resulting in no scattering, thus phonons propagate elastically across the interface. The wavevectors that propagate across the interface are determined by conservation of momentum. In DMM, the opposite extreme is assumed, a perfectly scattering interface. In this case the wavevectors that propagate across the interface are random and independent of incident phonons on the interface. For both models the detailed balance must still be obeyed.

For both models the basic equations of the phonon gas model apply. The flux of energy from one material to the other in one dimension is just:

$Q_{1,2} = \sum_{k} n \left ( k,T_1 \right ) E \nu \alpha \left ( k,T_1,T_2 \right )$

where $\nu$ is the group velocity which is approximated to be the speed of sound in the material for the AMM and DMM models, $n \left ( k,T_1 \right )$ is the number of phonons at a given wavevector, E is the energy, and α is the probability of transmission across the interface. The net flux is thus the difference of the energy fluxes:

$Q_{net}\ =\ Q_{1,2}\ -\ Q_{2,1}$

Since both fluxes are dependent on T_{1} and T_{2}, the relationship between the flux and the temperature difference can be used to determine the thermal interface resistance based on:

$R_{th}\ =\ \frac{\Delta T}{Q/A}$

where A is the area of the interface. These basic equations form the basis for both models. n is determined based on the dispersion relation for the materials (for example, the Debye model) and Bose–Einstein statistics. Energy is given simply by the De Broglie Wavelength Equation:

$E\ =\ \hbar\ \omega \left ( k \right )\$

where . The main difference between the two models is the transmission probability, whose determination is more complicated. In each case it is determined by the basic assumptions that form the respective models. The assumption of elastic scattering makes it more difficult for phonons to transmit across the interface, resulting in lower probabilities. As a result, the acoustic mismatch model typically represents an upper limit for thermal interface resistance, while the diffuse mismatch model represents the lower limit.

== Examples ==
=== Liquid helium interfaces ===
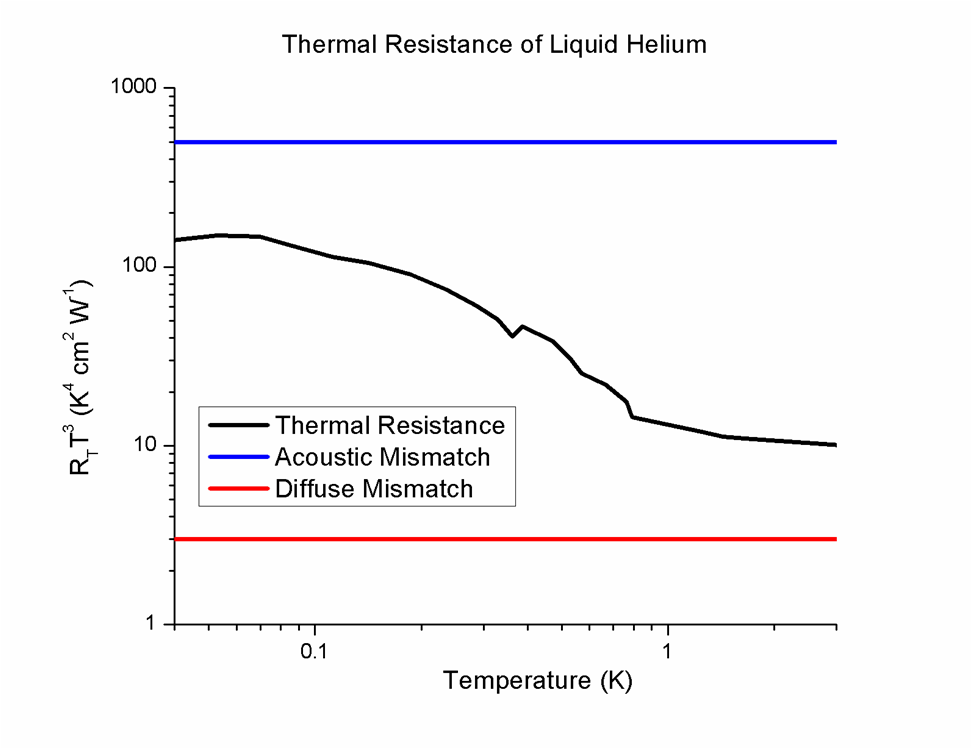
Typical Interfacial Resistance of Liquid Helium with metals. Resistance has been multiplied by T^{3} to remove the expected T^{−3} dependence. Adapted from

The presence of thermal interface resistance, corresponding to a discontinuous temperature across an interface was first proposed from studies of liquid helium in 1936. While this idea was first proposed in 1936, it wasn't until 1941 when Pyotr Kapitsa (Peter Kapitza) carried out the first systematic study of thermal interface behavior in liquid helium. The first major model for heat transfer at interfaces was the acoustic mismatch model which predicted a T^{−3} temperature dependence on the interfacial resistance, but this failed to properly model the thermal conductance of helium interfaces by as much as two orders of magnitude. Another surprising behavior of the thermal resistance was observed in the pressure dependence. Since the speed of sound is a strong function of temperature in liquid helium, the acoustic mismatch model predicts a strong pressure dependence of the interfacial resistance. Studies around 1960 surprisingly showed that the interfacial resistance was nearly independent of pressure, suggesting that other mechanisms were dominant.

The acoustic mismatch theory predicted a very high thermal resistance (low thermal conductance) at solid-helium interfaces. This is problematic for researchers working at ultra-cold temperatures because it greatly impedes cooling rates at low temperatures such as in dilution refrigerators. Fortunately such a large thermal resistance was not observed due to many mechanisms which promoted phonon transport. In liquid helium, Van der Waals forces actually work to solidify the first few monolayers against a solid. This boundary layer functions much like an anti-reflection coating in optics, so that phonons which would typically be reflected from the interface actually would transmit across the interface. This also helps to understand the pressure independence of the thermal conductance. The final dominant mechanism to anomalously low thermal resistance of liquid helium interfaces is the effect of surface roughness, which is not accounted for in the acoustic mismatch model. For a more detailed theoretical model of this aspect see the paper by A. Khater and J. Szeftel. Like electromagnetic waves which produce surface plasmons on rough surfaces, phonons can also induce surface waves. When these waves eventually scatter, they provide another mechanism for heat to transfer across the interface. Similarly, phonons are also capable of producing evanescent waves in a total internal reflection geometry. As a result, when these waves are scattered in the solid, additional heat is transferred from the helium beyond the prediction of the acoustic mismatch theory. For a more complete review on this topic see the review by Swartz.

=== Notable room temperature thermal conductance ===
In general there are two types of heat carriers in materials: phonons and electrons. The free electron gas found in metals is a very good conductor of heat and dominates thermal conductivity. All materials though exhibit heat transfer by phonon transport so heat flows even in dielectric materials such as silica. Interfacial thermal conductance is a measure of how efficiently heat carriers flow from one material to another. The lowest room temperature thermal conductance measurement to date is the Bi/Hydrogen-terminated diamond with a thermal conductance of 8.5 MW m^{−2} K^{−1}. As a metal, bismuth contains many electrons which serve as the primary heat carriers. Diamond on the other hand is a very good electrical insulator (although it has a very high thermal conductivity) and so electron transport between the materials is nil. Further, these materials have very different lattice parameters so phonons do not efficiently couple across the interface. Finally, the Debye temperature between the materials is significantly different. As a result, bismuth, which has a low Debye temperature, has many phonons at low frequencies. Diamond on the other hand has a very high Debye temperature and most of its heat-carrying phonons are at frequencies much higher than are present in bismuth.

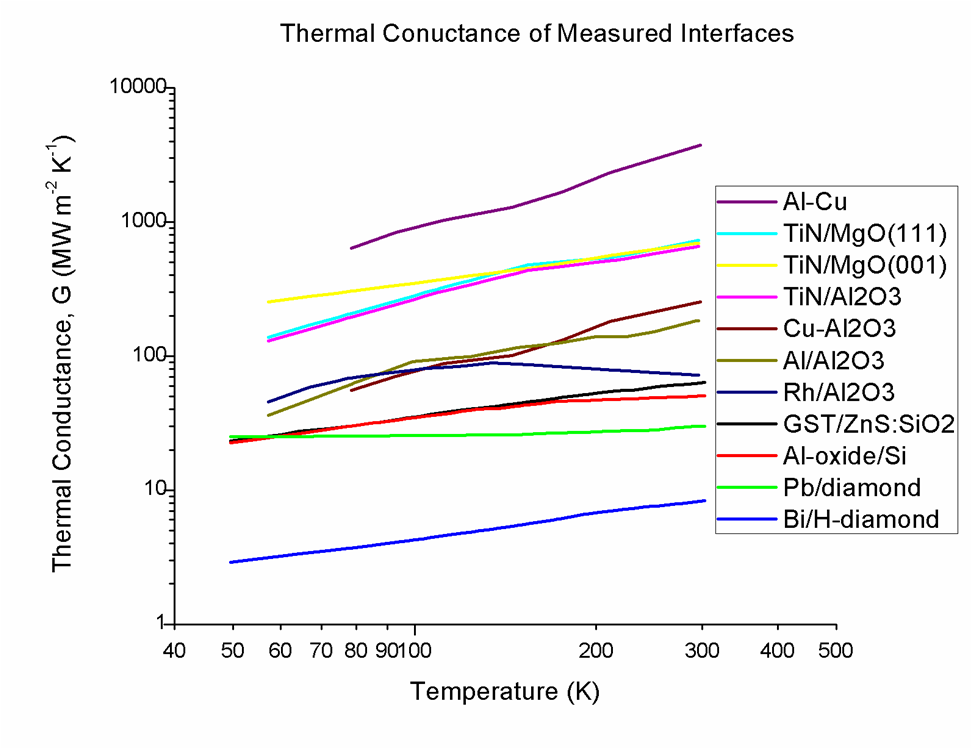
Thermal Conductance Data adapted from,

Increasing in thermal conductance, most phonon mediated interfaces (dielectric-dielectric and metal-dielectric) have thermal conductances between 80 and 300 MW m^{−2} K^{−1}. The largest phonon mediated thermal conductance measured to date is between TiN (Titanium Nitride) and MgO. These systems have very similar lattice structures and Debye temperatures. While there are no free electrons to enhance the thermal conductance of the interface, the similar physical properties of the two crystals facilitate a very efficient phonon transmission between the two materials.

At the highest end of the spectrum, one of the highest thermal conductances measured is between aluminum and copper. At room temperature, the Al-Cu interface has a conductance of 4 GW m^{−2} K^{−1}. The high thermal conductance of the interface should not be unexpected given the high electrical conductivity of both materials.

=== Interfacial resistance in carbon nanotubes ===
The superior thermal conductivity of Carbon nanotubes makes it an excellent candidate for making composite materials. But interfacial resistance impacts the effective thermal conductivity. This area is not well studied and only a few studies have been done to understand the basic mechanism of this resistance.
