= Insulating link =

Crane safety device

An insulating link is a device used on the hook of a crane to protect the crane operatives from the danger of electrocution should the crane come into contact with a power line. Insulating links are essentially robust insulators and prevent the flow of electricity from bare, suspended wires through cranes and into personnel working near the crane. Variants of insulating links are also made for specific use in antenna guy wires, and foundry and munitions applications.

== History ==
The dangers of working near overhead power lines, which have no insulation covering their wires, first became apparent with the electrification of Western countries in the first half of the twentieth century. As early as 1931 there was a patent for an insulator that could be affixed to a crane’s wire rope or chain in order to prevent electrocution. Such early designs, however, proved unreliable because of their inability to operate safely in all construction crane environments.

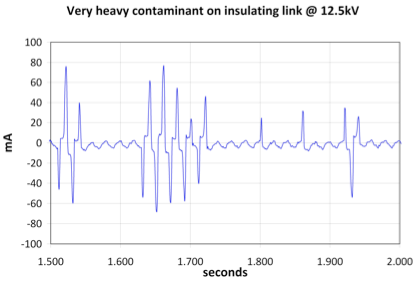
Figure 2. Contamination on insulating link

Figure 3. Heartbeat fibrillation

By 1965 Federal law mandated the use of insulating links on cranes in the United States. However, this requirement was lifted in the 1980s after an investigation found that lethal levels of electric current could pass through the insulating links in use at that time due to environmental contamination. This problem meant that insulating links were not widely used until new designs were developed in the 1990s.

New developments in insulating link technology, that take account of the likelihood of insulating links being used in the typically dirty and wet construction industry environment, meant that the US Government introduced a new law in 2010 that mandated the use of approved insulating links in certain situations. These insulating links must be tested and approved by a Nationally Recognized Testing Laboratory to a standard such as ASTM F2973 or ANSI/CPLSO-14. Currently, there are no insulated links/devices that meet the NRTL requirement in OSHA's § 1926.1401 definition of "insulated link/device".

== Purpose ==
Figure 4. An insulating link being used on a crane

Insulating links may be used on cranes and tag lines, (guide ropes), to help protect against electric current passing from the power line through the wire rope of the crane and into the personnel working on the crane, figure 4. Figure 5 shows the Federal requirements for working close to a power line. The list includes layers of prevention. Incidents of power line contact are common because of the difficulty the driver of the crane has in distinguishing the thin cable of the power line against the background of the sky. Implementing OSHA's federal requirements for operation near electric powerlines, which includes using a spotter to help the operator know if the crane's wire rope is getting close to the thin cable of the power line, provides for safe operation.

Figure 5. Federal requirements for using an insulating link

Accidents involving contact between a power line and a crane are invariably extremely serious, often resulting in extensive injury or the death of crane operative(s). In fact, on average 100 contacts occur each year in the US between a crane and a power line, while 20% of all fatalities in the US construction industry are due to cranes touching power lines. Electrocution because of power line contact is sufficient to cause ventricular fibrillation of the heart, often fatal, while the wound caused by the electric current leaving the body will often remove limbs.

Grounding a crane is not effective, since enough current can still pass through crane operatives to be fatal.
