= Isolation =

Isolation or isolated may also refer to:

== Sociology and psychology ==
- Social isolation, a lack of social contact by an individual
- Isolation (psychology), a defense mechanism in psychoanalytic theory
- Emotional isolation, a feeling of isolation despite a functioning social network
- Isolation effect, a psychological effect of distinctive items more easily remembered

== Mathematics ==
- Real-root isolation
- Isolation lemma, a technique used to reduce the number of solutions to a computational problem.
- Isolated point, a topological notion of having no points near a given point
- Solving an equation, isolating a variable in the left-hand side of an equation

== Natural sciences ==
- Electrical or galvanic isolation, isolating functional sections of electrical systems to prevent current flowing between them
- An isolated system, a system without any external exchange
- Isolating language, a type of language with a low morpheme-per-word ratio
- Isolation (microbiology), techniques to separate microbes from a sample containing mixtures of microbes
- Reproductive isolation, in population genetics, prevents members of two different species from producing offspring if they cross or mate
- Topographic isolation of a summit, the great circle distance to the nearest point of equal elevation

== Engineering and computer sciences ==
- In electronics, a measure of how well two ports are disconnected in devices such as directional couplers and circulators
- Isolation (database systems), how and when the changes made by one operation become visible to other concurrent operations
- In computer security, another name for software sandboxing
- Vibration isolation, in engineering, the process of isolating an object from the source of vibrations

== Arts and entertainment ==
=== Film and television ===
- Isolation (2005 film), an Irish horror film
- Isolation (2009 film), a British documentary
- Isolation, a 2015 drama film featuring Dominic Purcell, Stephen Lang, and Tricia Helfer
- "Isolation" (The Walking Dead), an episode of the television series The Walking Dead

=== Music ===
- Isolation (Kali Uchis album), 2018
- "Isolation", a song by Cherry Glazer from 2019 album Stuffed & Ready
- "Isolation", a song by Die Krupps from 1995 album III - Odyssey of the Mind
- "Isolation" (Alter Bridge song), 2010
- Isolation (Carpathian album), 2008
- Isolation (Fear My Thoughts album), 2008
- "Isolation" (John Lennon song), 1970
- "Isolation" (Joy Division song), 1980
- "Isolation" (Kreator song), 1995
- Isolation (Toto album), 1984

=== Other arts and entertainment ===
- Isolation (board game), a 1972 board game
- Isolation (illusion), an illusion whereby a prop appears to float in space
- Isolation (novel), a 2012 novella by Dan Wells
- Isolation (poker), a play specifically for the purpose of making the hand a one-on-one contest with a specific opponent

== Other uses ==
- Isolation (health care), various measures taken to prevent contagious diseases from being spread
- Mount Isolation, New Hampshire, United States

== See also ==
- Insulation (disambiguation)
- Isolate (disambiguation)
- Isolator (disambiguation)
- Isolationism
- Uncontacted peoples, indigenous peoples living in isolation from the external world
- Solitary confinement, a special form of imprisonment in which a prisoner is isolated from most or all human contact
- Solitude, a state of seclusion or isolation, i.e., lack of contact with people
