= Thermal contact =

Type of heat transfer

In heat transfer and thermodynamics, a thermodynamic system is said to be in thermal contact with another system if it can exchange energy through the process of heat. One type of this is thermal contact conduction, where heat transfer occurs. Perfect thermal isolation is an idealization as real systems are always in thermal contact with their environment to some extent.

When two solid bodies are in contact, a resistance to heat transfer exists between the bodies. The study of heat conduction between such bodies is called thermal contact conductance (or thermal contact resistance).

== See also ==
- Thermal equilibrium - When two objects A and B are in thermal contact and there is no net transfer of thermal energy from A to B or from B to A, they are said to be in thermal equilibrium. The majority of objects experiencing thermal equilibrium still do exchange thermal energy but do so equally so that the net heat transfer is zero.
- Perfect thermal contact
- Zeroth law of thermodynamics - When two objects A and B are in thermal equilibrium with a third object C then, A and B are said to be in thermal equilibrium with each other.
