= Insulator =

Insulator may refer to:

- Insulator (electricity), a substance that resists electricity
  - Pin insulator, a device that isolates a wire from a physical support such as a pin on a utility pole
  - Strain insulator, a device that is designed to work in mechanical tension to withstand the pull of a suspended electrical wire or cable
  - Mott insulator, a type of electrical insulator
  - Topological insulator, a material that behaves as an insulator in its interior while permitting the movement of charges on its boundary
- Insulator (genetics), an element in the genetic code
- Thermal insulation, a material used to resist the flow of heat
- Building insulation, the material used in building construction to prevent heat loss

== See also ==
- Insulation (disambiguation)
