= Thermal contact conductance =

Study of heat conduction between solid bodies

In physics, thermal contact conductance is the study of heat conduction between solid or liquid bodies in thermal contact. The thermal contact conductance coefficient, $h_c$, is a property indicating the thermal conductivity, or ability to conduct heat, between two bodies in contact. The inverse of this property is termed thermal contact resistance.

== Definition ==
Fig. 1: Heat flow between two solids in contact and the temperature distribution.

When two solid bodies come in contact, such as A and B in Figure 1, heat flows from the hotter body to the colder body. From experience, the temperature profile along the two bodies varies, approximately, as shown in the figure. A temperature drop is observed at the interface between the two surfaces in contact. This phenomenon is said to be a result of a thermal contact resistance existing between the contacting surfaces. Thermal contact resistance is defined as the ratio between this temperature drop and the average heat flow across the interface.

According to Fourier's law, the heat flow between the bodies is found by the relation:

$q=-kA\frac{dT}{dx}$	1

where $q$ is the heat flow, $k$ is the thermal conductivity, $A$ is the cross sectional area and $dT/dx$ is the temperature gradient in the direction of flow.

From considerations of conservation of energy, the heat flow between the two bodies in contact, bodies A and B, is found as:

$q=\frac{T_1 - T_3}{X_A/(k_A A)+1/(h_c A) + X_B/(k_B A)}$	2

One may observe that the heat flow is directly related to the thermal conductivities of the bodies in contact, $k_A$ and $k_B$, the contact area $A$, and the thermal contact resistance, $1/h_c$, which, as previously noted, is the inverse of the thermal conductance coefficient, $h_c$.

== Importance ==
Most experimentally determined values of the thermal contact resistance fall between 0.000005 and 0.0005 m^{2} K/W (the corresponding range of thermal contact conductance is 200,000 to 2000 W/m^{2} K). To know whether the thermal contact resistance is significant or not, magnitudes of the thermal resistances of the layers are compared with typical values of thermal contact resistance. Thermal contact resistance is significant and may dominate for good heat conductors such as metals but can be neglected for poor heat conductors such as insulators. Thermal contact conductance is an important factor in a variety of applications, largely because many physical systems contain a mechanical combination of two materials. Some of the fields where contact conductance is of importance are:

- Electronics
  - Electronic packaging
  - Heat sinks
  - Brackets
- Industry
  - Nuclear reactor cooling
  - Gas turbine cooling
  - Internal combustion engines
  - Heat exchangers
  - Thermal insulation
  - Press hardening of automotive steels
- Flight
  - Hypersonic flight vehicles
  - Thermal supervision for space vehicles
- Residential/building science
  - Performance of building envelopes

== Factors influencing contact conductance ==
Fig. 2: An enlargement of the interface between two contacting surfaces. The finish quality is exaggerated for the sake of the argument.

Thermal contact conductance is a complicated phenomenon, influenced by many factors. Experience shows that the most important ones are as follows:

=== Contact pressure ===
For thermal transport between two contacting bodies, such as particles in a granular medium, the contact pressure, and the area of true contact area that arises from this, is the factor of most influence on overall contact conductance . Governed by an interface's Normal contact stiffness, as contact pressure grows, true contact area increases and contact conductance grows (contact resistance becomes smaller).

Since the contact pressure is the most important factor, most studies, correlations and mathematical models for measurement of contact conductance are done as a function of this factor.

The thermal contact resistance of certain sandwich kinds of materials that are manufactured by rolling under high temperatures may sometimes be ignored because the decrease in thermal conductivity between them is negligible.

=== Interstitial materials ===
No truly smooth surfaces really exist, and surface imperfections are visible under a microscope. As a result, when two bodies are pressed together, contact is only performed in a finite number of points, separated by relatively large gaps, as can be shown in Fig. 2. Since the actual contact area is reduced, another resistance for heat flow exists. The gases/fluids filling these gaps may largely influence the total heat flow across the interface. The thermal conductivity of the interstitial material and its pressure, examined through reference to the Knudsen number, are the two properties governing its influence on contact conductance, and thermal transport in heterogeneous materials in general.

In the absence of interstitial materials, as in a vacuum, the contact resistance will be much larger, since flow through the intimate contact points is dominant.

=== Surface roughness, waviness and flatness ===
One can characterise a surface that has undergone certain finishing operations by three main properties of: roughness, waviness, and fractal dimension. Among these, roughness and fractality are of most importance, with roughness often indicated in terms of a rms value, $\sigma$ and surface fractality denoted generally by D_{f}. The effect of surface structures on thermal conductivity at interfaces is analogous to the concept of electrical contact resistance, also known as ECR, involving contact patch restricted transport of phonons rather than electrons.

=== Surface deformations ===
When the two bodies come in contact, surface deformation may occur on both bodies. This deformation may either be plastic or elastic, depending on the material properties and the contact pressure. When a surface undergoes plastic deformation, contact resistance is lowered, since the deformation causes the actual contact area to increase

=== Surface cleanliness ===
The presence of dust particles, acids, etc., can also influence the contact conductance.

== Measurement of thermal contact conductance ==
Going back to Formula 2, calculation of the thermal contact conductance may prove difficult, even impossible, due to the difficulty in measuring the contact area, $A$ (A product of surface characteristics, as explained earlier). Because of this, contact conductance/resistance is usually found experimentally, by using a standard apparatus.

The results of such experiments are usually published in Engineering literature, on journals such as Journal of Heat Transfer, International Journal of Heat and Mass Transfer, etc. Unfortunately, a centralized database of contact conductance coefficients does not exist, a situation which sometimes causes companies to use outdated, irrelevant data, or not taking contact conductance as a consideration at all.

CoCoE (Contact Conductance Estimator), a project founded to solve this problem and create a centralized database of contact conductance data and a computer program that uses it, was started in 2006.

== Thermal boundary conductance ==
While a finite thermal contact conductance is due to voids at the interface, surface waviness, and surface roughness, etc., a finite conductance exists even at near ideal interfaces as well. This conductance, known as thermal boundary conductance, is due to the differences in electronic and vibrational properties between the contacting materials. This conductance is generally much higher than thermal contact conductance, but becomes important in nanoscale material systems.

== See also ==
- Heat transfer
