= Thermal diffusivity =

Rate at which heat spreads throughout a material

In thermodynamics, thermal diffusivity is the thermal conductivity divided by density and specific heat capacity at constant pressure. It is a measure of the rate of heat transfer inside a material and has SI units of m^{2}/s. It is an intensive property. Thermal diffusivity is usually denoted by lowercase alpha (α), but a, h, κ (kappa), K, D, $D_T$ are also used.

The formula is
$$\alpha = \frac{k}{\rho c_p},$$
where

k is thermal conductivity (W/(m·K)),
c_{p} is specific heat capacity (J/(kg·K)),
ρ is density (kg/m^{3}).

Together, ρc_{p} can be considered the volumetric heat capacity (J/(m^{3}·K)).

Thermal diffusivity is a positive coefficient in the heat equation:
$$\frac{\partial T}{\partial t} = \alpha \nabla^2 T.$$

One way to view thermal diffusivity is as the ratio of the time derivative of temperature to its curvature, quantifying the rate at which temperature concavity is "smoothed out". In a substance with high thermal diffusivity, heat moves rapidly through it because the substance conducts heat quickly relative to its energy storage capacity or "thermal bulk".

Thermal diffusivity and thermal effusivity are related concepts and quantities used to simulate non-equilibrium thermodynamics. Diffusivity is the more fundamental concept and describes the stochastic process of heat spread throughout some local volume of a substance. Effusivity describes the corresponding transient process of heat flow through some local area of interest. Upon reaching a steady state, where the stored energy distribution stabilizes, the thermal conductivity (k) may be sufficient to describe heat transfers inside solid or rigid bodies by applying Fourier's law.

Thermal diffusivity is often measured with the flash method. It involves heating a strip or cylindrical sample with a short energy pulse at one end and analyzing the temperature change (reduction in amplitude and phase shift of the pulse) a short distance away.

== Thermal diffusivity of selected materials and substances ==
Thermal diffusivity of selected materials and substances
Material	Thermal diffusivity (mm^{2}/s)	Refs.
Pyrolytic graphite, parallel to layers	1220	
Diamond	1060–1160	
Carbon/carbon composite at 25 °C	216.5	
Helium (300 K, 1 atm)	190	
Silver, pure (99.9%)	165.63	
Hydrogen (300 K, 1 atm)	160	
Gold	127	
Copper at 25 °C	111	
Aluminium	97	
Silicon	88	
Al-10Si-Mn-Mg (Silafont 36) at 20 °C	74.2	
Aluminium 6061-T6 Alloy	64	
Molybdenum (99.95%) at 25 °C	54.3	
Al-5Mg-2Si-Mn (Magsimal-59) at 20 °C	44.0	
Tin	40	
Water vapor (1 atm, 400 K)	23.38	
Iron	23	
Argon (300 K, 1 atm)	22	
Nitrogen (300 K, 1 atm)	22	
Air (300 K)	19	
Steel, AISI 1010 (0.1% carbon)	18.8	
Aluminium oxide (polycrystalline)	12.0	
Steel, 1% carbon	11.72	
Titanium	9.3	
Si_{3}N_{4} with CNTs 26 °C	9.142	
Si_{3}N_{4} without CNTs 26 °C	8.605	
Steel, stainless 304A at 27 °C	4.2	
Pyrolytic graphite, normal to layers	3.6	
Steel, stainless 310 at 25 °C	3.352	
Inconel 600 at 25 °C	3.428	
Quartz	1.4	
Sandstone	1.15	
Ice at 0 °C	1.02	
Silicon dioxide (polycrystalline)	0.83	
Brick, common	0.52	
Glass, window	0.34	
Brick, adobe	0.27	
PC (polycarbonate) at 25 °C	0.144	
Water at 25 °C	0.143	
PTFE (Polytetrafluorethylene) at 25 °C	0.124	
PP (polypropylene) at 25 °C	0.096	
Nylon	0.09	
Rubber	0.089–0.13	
Wood (yellow pine)	0.082	
Paraffin at 25 °C	0.081	
PVC (polyvinyl chloride)	0.08	
Oil, engine (saturated liquid, 100 °C)	0.0738	
Alcohol	0.07	

== See also ==
- Diffusion
- List of thermodynamic properties
