= List of thermal conductivities =

In heat transfer, the thermal conductivity of a substance, k, is an intensive property that indicates its ability to conduct heat. For most materials, the amount of heat conducted varies (usually non-linearly) with temperature.

Thermal conductivity is often measured with laser flash analysis. Alternative measurements are also established.

Mixtures may have variable thermal conductivities due to composition. Note that for gases in usual conditions, heat transfer by advection (caused by convection or turbulence for instance) is the dominant mechanism compared to conduction.

This table shows thermal conductivity in SI units of watts per metre-kelvin (W·m^{−1}·K^{−1}). Some measurements use the imperial unit BTUs per foot per hour per degree Fahrenheit (1 BTU h^{−1} ft^{−1} F^{−1} = 1.728 W·m^{−1}·K^{−1}).

== Sortable list ==
This concerns materials at atmospheric pressure and around 293 K (20 °C).

Material	Thermal conductivity [W·m^{−1}·K^{−1}]	Notes
Acrylic glass (Plexiglas V045i)	0.170–0.200	
Alcohols, oils	0.100	
Aluminium	237	
Aluminium nitride	321	For high-quality single crystal.
Aluminium oxide	30	
Beryllium oxide	209–330	
Bismuth	7.97	
Boron arsenide	1300	
Cubic boron nitride	740	
Copper	401	For main article, see Copper in heat exchangers.
Diamond	1000	
Fiberglass or foam-glass	0.045	
Germanium	60.2	
Gold	315	
Kapton (tape)	0.20	
Manganese	7.810	Lowest thermal conductivity of any pure metal.
Marble	2.070–2.940	
Expanded polystyrene	0.033–0.046	
Polyurethane foam	0.03	
Silica aerogel	0.02	
Silicon nitride	90 or 177	Ceramics material.
Silver	429	Highest thermal conductivity of any pure metal.
Snow (dry)	0.050–0.250	
Tantalum nitride	1,100	Metallic theta-phase
Teflon	0.250	
Water	0.5918	

== Analytical list ==
Thermal conductivities have been measured with longitudinal heat flow methods where the experimental arrangement is so designed to accommodate heat flow in only the axial direction, temperatures are constant, and radial heat loss is prevented or minimized. For the sake of simplicity the conductivities that are found by that method in all of its variations are noted as L conductivities, those that are found by radial measurements of the sort are noted as R conductivities, and those that are found from periodic or transient heat flow are distinguished as P conductivities. Numerous variations of all of the above and various other methods have been discussed by some G. K. White, M. J. Laubits, D. R. Flynn, B. O. Peirce and R. W. Wilson and various other theorists who are noted in an international Data Series from Purdue University, Volume I pages 14a–38a.

This concerns materials at various temperatures and pressures.

Material	Thermal conductivity [W·m^{−1}·K^{−1}]	Temperature [K]	Electrical conductivity @ 293 K [Ω^{−1}·m^{−1}]	Notes
Acrylic glass (Plexiglas V045i)	0.17-0.19-0.2	296	7.143E-15 - 5.0E-14	Note: There are no negative conductivities and the symbols that could be read that way are hyphens to separate various estimates and measurements.
Air and thin air and high tech vacuums, macrostructure	0.024-0.025; 0.0262 (1 bar); 0.0457 (1 bar) Formula values d=1 centimeter Standard Atmospheric Pressure; 0.0209; 0.0235; 0.0260; List; 0.1 atmosphere 0.0209; 0.0235; 0.0260; 0.01 atmospheres 0.0209; 0.0235; 0.0259; 0.001 atmospheres 0.0205; 0.0230; 0.0254; 0.0001 atmospheres 0.0178; 0.0196; 0.0212; 10^{−5}atmospheres 0.00760; 0.00783; 0.00800; 10^{−6}atmospheres 0.00113; 0.00112; 0.00111; 10^{−7}atmospheres 0.000119; 0.000117; 0.000115; List	273-293-298; 300; 600 233.2; 266.5; 299.9 233.2; 266.5; 299.9 233.2; 266.5; 299.9 233.2; 266.5; 299.9 233.2; 266.5; 299.9 233.2; 266.5; 299.9 233.2; 266.5; 299.9 233.2; 266.5; 299.9	hiAerosols2.95-loAerosols7.83×10^{−15}	(78.03%N_{2},21%O_{2},+0.93%Ar,+0.04%CO_{2}) (1 atm) The plate distance is one centimeter, the special conductivity values were calculated from the Lasance approximation formula in The Thermal conductivity of Air at Reduced Pressures and Length Scales and the primary values were taken from Weast at the normal pressure tables in the CRC handbook on page E2. Let K_{0} is the normal conductivity at one bar (10^{5} N/m^{2}) pressure, K_{e} is its conductivity at special pressure and/or length scale. Let d is a plate distance in meters, P is an air pressure in Pascals (N/m^{2}), T is temperature Kelvin, C is this Lasance constant 7.6 ⋅ 10^{−5} m ⋅ K/N and PP is the product P ⋅ d/T. The Lasance approximation formula is K_{e}/K_{0} = 1/(1+C/PP). Some readers might find the notation confusing since the original mK might be interpreted as milliKelvins when it is really meter-Kelvins. He^{(Lasance?)} puts a one (1) at the end of his equation so that it appears like this: K_{e}/K_{0} = 1/(1+C/PP)(1). Eventually you can find out from his graph that the (1) at the end is not part of his formula and instead he is citing his graph.
Air and thin air and high tech vacuums, microstructure	Formula Values d=1 millimeter Standard Atmospheric Pressure; 0.0209; 0.0235; 0.0260; 0.1 atmosphere 0.0209; 0.0235; 0.0259; 0.01 atmospheres 0.0205; 0.0230; 0.0254; 0.001 atmospheres 0.0178; 0.0196; 0.0212; 0.0001 atmospheres 0.00760; 0.00783; 0.00800; 10^{−5} atmospheres 0.00113; 0.00112; 0.00111; 10^{−6} atmospheres 0.000119; 0.000117; 0.000115; 10^{−7} atmospheres 0.0000119; 0.0000117; 0.0000116; List	233.2; 266.5; 299.9 233.2; 266.5; 299.9 233.2; 266.5; 299.9 233.2; 266.5; 299.9 233.2; 266.5; 299.9 233.2; 266.5; 299.9 233.2; 266.5; 299.9 233.2; 266.5; 299.9		All values calculated from the Lasance formula: Lasance, Clemens J., "The Thermal Conductivity of Air at Reduced Pressures and Length Scales," Electronics Cooling, November 2002. Plate separation = one millimeter.
Air, standard air	0.00922; 0.01375; 0.01810; 0.02226; 0.02614; 0.02970; 0.03305; 0.03633; 0.03951; 0.0456; 0.0513; 0.0569; 0.0625; 0.0672; 0.0717; 0.0759; 0.0797; 0.0835; 0.0870; List, TPRC 3, pp 511–12	100; 150; 200; 250; 300; 350; 400; 450; 500; 600; 700; 800; 900; 1000; 1100; 1200; 1300; 1400; 1500		
Air, typical air	30°N January; Sea Level: 0.02535; 1000 meters: 0.02509; 2000 meters: 0.02483; 3000 meters: 0.02429; 30°N July; Sea Level: 0.02660; 1000 meters: 0.02590; 2000 meters: 0.02543; 3000 meters: 0.02497; 60°N January; Sea Level: 0.02286; 1000 meters: 0.02302; 2000 meters: 0.02276; 3000 meters: 0.02250; List USSAS pp 103, 107 &123	288.52; 285.25; 281.87; 275.14 304.58; 295.59; 289.56; 283.75 257.28; 259.31; 256.08; 252.85		TPRC standard air is very nearly equivalent to typical air worldwide.
Air, wet air	≈Typical Air			
Air in motor windings at normal pressure, Lasance approximations	360 Kelvins; 10^{−2} meters: 0.03039; 10^{−3} meters: 0.03038; 10^{−4} meters: 0.03031; 10^{−5} meters: 0.02959; List, TPRC Vol 3 page 512.	360		An investigator has reported some high values for the thermal conductivity of some metal air laminates both varnished and otherwise. See Taylor, T.S., Elec. World Vol 76 (24), 1159–62, 1920 in TPRC Data Series Vol 2, pp 1037–9.
Alcohols or oils	0.1-0.110-0.21-0.212	293-298-300		
Aluminium, alloy	Mannchen 1931: 92% Aluminum, 8% Magnesium; Cast L 72.8; 100.0; 126.4; 139.8 Annealed L 76.6; 104.6; 120.1; 135.6 88%Aluminium, 12% Magnesium; Cast; 56.1; 77.4; 101.3; 118.4 Mever-Rassler 1940: 93.0% Aluminium, 7.0% Magnesium; 108.7; List	87; 273; 373; 476 87; 273; 373; 476 87; 273; 373; 476 348.2		Mannchen, W., Z Metalik..23, 193–6, 1931 in TPRC Volume 1 pages 478, 479 and 1447. Mever-Rassler. The Mever-Rassler alloy has a density of 2.63 g cm^{−1}. Mever-Rassler, F., Metallwirtschaft. 19, 713–21, 1940 in Volume 1 pages 478, 479 and 1464.
Aluminium, pure	204.3-205-220-237-250; 214.6; 249.3; CRC Aluminum; 99.996+% Pure Aluminum; 780; 1550; 2320; 3080; 3810; 4510; 5150; 5730; 6220; 6610; 6900; 7080; 7150; 7130; 7020; 6840; 6350; 5650; 4000; 2850; 2100; 1600; 1250; 1000; 670; 500; 400; 340; 300; 247; 237; 235; 236; 237; 240; 240; 237; 232; 226; 220; 213; List	293-298; 366; 478 1; 2; 3; 4; 5; 6; 7; 8; 9; 10; 11; 12; 13; 14; 15; 16; 18; 20; 25; 30; 35; 40; 45; 50; 60; 70; 80; 90; 100; 150; 200; 250; 273; 300; 350; 400; 500; 600; 700; 800; 900	37,450,000 - 37,740,000 Cryogenic: up to 1.858 ⋅ 10^{11} at 4.2 K. Formula Values; 3.85 ⋅ 10^{7} at 273.15K; 3.45 ⋅ 10^{7} at 300K; 2.50 ⋅ 10^{7} at 400K.	This material is superconductive (electrical) at temperatures below 1.183 Kelvins. Weast page E-78
Aluminum, ultrapure	TPRC Aluminum; 99.9999% Pure Aluminum; 4102; 8200; 12100; 15700; 18800; 21300; 22900; 23800; 24000; 23500; 22700; 20200; 17600; 11700; 7730; 3180[?] 2380; 1230; 754; 532; 414; 344; 302; 248; 237; 236; 237; 240; 237; 232; 226; 220; 213; List	1; 2; 3; 4; 5; 6; 7; 8; 9; 10; 11; 13; 15; 20; 25; 30; 40; 50; 60; 70; 80; 90; 100; 150; 200; 273.2; 300; 400; 500; 600; 700; 800; 900		These are not measured values. Very high thermal conductivity measurements up to 22,600 w m^{−1} K^{−1} were reported by Fenton, E.W., Rogers, J.S. and Woods, S.D. in reference 570 on page 1458, 41, 2026–33, 1963. The data is listed on pages 6 through 8 and graphed on page 1 where Fenton and company are on curves 63 and 64. Next the government-recommended values are listed and graphed on page 9. Thermophysical Properties Research Center. Performing Organization: Purdue University. Controlling Organization: Defense Logistics Agency. Documented summaries from numerous scientific journals, etc. and critical estimates. 17000 pages in 13 volumes.
Aluminium nitride	170-175-190	293	1×10^{−11}	
Aluminium oxide	Pure 26-30-35-39-40; NBS, Ordinary; 27; 16; 10.5; 8.0; 6.6; 5.9; 5.6; 5.6; 6.0; 7.2; List; Slip Cast R 11.1; 10.0; 8.37; 7.95; 6.90; 5.86; 5.65; 5.65; 5.65; List: Kingery, TPRC II page 99 curve 7 ref.5 Sapphire R 15.5; 13.9; 12.4; 10.6; 8.71; 8.04; 7.68; 7.59; 7.61; 7.86; 8.13; 8.49; List: Kingery, TPRC II page 96 curve 19 ref.72	293 400; 600; 800; 1000; 1200; 1400; 1600; 1800; 2000; 2200 613.2; 688.2; 703.2; 873.2; 943.2; 1033.2; 1093; 1203.2; 1258.2 591.5; 651.2; 690.2; 775.2; 957.2; 1073.2; 1173.2; 1257.2; 1313.2; 1384.2; 14X9.2; 1508.2	1×10^{−12}-	The NBS recommended ordinary values are for 99.5% pure polycrystalline alumina at 98% density. Slip Cast Values are taken from Kingery, W.D., J. Am Ceram. Soc., 37, 88–90, 1954, TPRC II page 99 curve 7 ref. 5 page 1159. Sapphire values are taken from Kingery, W.D. and Norton, F.H., USAEC Rept. NYO-6447, 1–14, 1955, TPRC II pages 94, 96, curve 19 ref. 72 page 1160. Errata: The numbered references in the NSRDS-NBS-8 pdf are found near the end of the TPRC Data Book Volume 2 and not somewhere in Volume 3 like it says.
Aluminium oxide, porous	22% Porosity 2.3	Constant 1000-1773		This is number 54 on pages 73 and 76. Shakhtin, D.M. and Vishnevskii, I.I., 1957, interval 893-1773 Kelvins.
Ammonia, saturated	0.507	300		
Argon	0.016-0.01772-0.0179	298-300		
Basalt	Stephens Basalt Sample NTS No. 1 R 1.76; 1.62; 1.80; 1.84; 1.63; 1.84; 1.58; 1.92; 1.84; Sample NTS No. 2 R 1.36; 1.45; 1.53; 1.67; 1.72; 1.57; 1.60; 1.63; List Robertson Basalt 5% olivine, 100% solidity* & 5MPa pressure Intrinsic: K = 2.55 W ⋅ m^{−1} ⋅ K^{−1} Air in Pores: K =1.58; Water in Pores: K = 1.97; List: Robertson pages 7, 11 & 13.	576; 596; 658; 704; 748; 822; 895; 964; 1048 442; 483; 529; 584; 623; 711; 762; 858 300		These measurements of two samples of NTS Basalt were credited to some D.R. Stephens, USAEC UCRL — 7605, 1–19, 1963. They are reported in the TPRC Data Series in Volume 2 on pages 798 and 799. Ki-iti Horai, Thermal conductivity of Rock Forming minerals, Journal of Geophysical Research, Volume 76, Issue 5, pages 1278 — 1308, February 10, 1971.: Solidity ≡ The ratio of the volume of solid to the bulk volume, or the ratio of bulk density to solid grain density, d_{B}/d_{G}. Robertson, p. 5.
Beryllium oxide	218-260-300; TPRC Recommended; 424; 302; 272; 196; 146; 111; 87; 70; 57; 47; 39; 33; 28.3; 24.5; 21.5; 19.5; 18.0; 16.7; 15.6; 15.0; List	293 200; 273.2; 300; 400; 500; 600; 700; 800; 900; 1000; 1100; 1200; 1300; 1400; 1500; 1600; 1700; 1800; 1900; 2000	1×10^{−12}	Recommended values are found on page 137 of volume 2, TPRC Data Series, 1971
Bismuth	7.97	300		
Brass Cu63%	125	296	15,150,000 - 16,130,000	(Cu63%, Zn37%)
Brass Cu70%	109 - 121	293-296	12,820,000 - 16,130,000	(Cu70%, Zn30%)
Brick	0.15-0.6-0.69-1.31 British 2016: Inner leaf (1700 kg/m3): 0.62; Outer leaf (1700 kg/m3): 0.84; 1920s Values: Brick #1: 0.674; Brick #2: 0.732	293-298 373.2; 373.2		Brick #1: 76.32% SiO_{2}, 21.96%Al_{2}O_{3}, 1.88%Fe_{2}O_{3} traces of CaO and MgO, commercial brick, density 1.795 g ⋅ cm^{−3}. Brick #2: 76.52%SiO_{2}, 13.67%Al_{2}O_{3}, 6.77%Fe_{2}O_{3}, 1.77%CaO, 0.42%MgO, 0.27%MnO, no specified density. Judging from the descriptions the TPRC has put the wrong labels on their bricks, and if that is the case then Brick #1 is "Common Brick" and Brick #2 is "Red Brick." Tadokoro, Y., Science Repts. Tohoku Imp. Univ., 10, 339–410, 1921, TPRC pages 493 & 1169.
Bronze	26; 42-50	293-296	5,882,000 - 7,143,000	Sn25% (Cu89%, Sn11%)
Calcium silicate	0.063	373		
Carbon dioxide	0.0146-0.01465-0.0168 (sat. liquid 0.087)	298-273-300 (293)		
Carbon nanotubes, bulk	2.5 (multiwall) - 35 (single wall, disordered mats) - 200(single wall, aligned mats)	300		"Bulk" refers to a group of nanotubes either arranged or disordered, for a single nanotube, see "carbon nanotube, single".
Carbon nanotube, single	3180 (multiwall)-3500 (single wall) (SWcalc.6,600-37,000)	320-300 (300-100)	(Lateral)10^{−16} - (Ballistic)10^{8})	values only for one single SWNT(length:2.6 μm, diameter:1.7 nm) and CNT. "Single", as opposed to "bulk" quantity (see "carbon nanotubes, bulk") of many nanotubes, which should not be confused with the denomination of nanotubes themselves which can be singlewall(SWNT) or multiwall(CNT)
Cerium dioxide	1.70; 1.54; 1.00; 0.938; 0.851; 0.765; List: TPRC II pp. 145–6	1292.1; 1322.1; 1555.9; 1628.2; 1969.2; 2005.9		Pears, C.D., Project director, Southern Res. Inst. Tech. Documentary Rept. ASD TDR-62-765, 20-402, 1963. TPRC Vol 2, pages 145, 146 and 1162
Concrete	0.8 - 1.28 - 1.65 - 2.5	293		~61-67%CaO
Copper, commercial	Wright, W. H., M. S. Thesis: Sample 1 L 423; 385; 358; 311; 346; 347; 350; 360; Sample 2 L 353; 360; 366; 363; 365; Lists: TPRC I page 75 curve 129 Taga, M., periodical First run: 378; Second run: 374; Third run: 378; Fourth run: 382; List: TPRC I page 75 curve 129	80.06; 95.34; 115.62; 135.53; 159.46; 181.56; 198.35; 217.30 198.53; 220.90; 240.88; 257.38; 275.40 363.2; 363.2; 363.2; 363.2		Wright, W. H., M. S. Thesis, Georgia Institute of Technology, 1–225, 1960. TPRC Data Series Volume 1, pages 75 and 80 curve 129, ref. page 1465. Taga, commercial grade, 99.82% purity, density 8.3 g⋅cm^{−3}. Taga, M., [Bull?], Japan Soc. Mech. Engrs., 3 (11) 346–52, 1960. TPRC Data Series Vol 1, pages 74, 79 and 1459.
Copper, pure	385-386-390-401; 368.7; 353.1; 1970s values: TPRC (American); 2870; 13800; 19600; 10500; 4300; 2050; 1220; 850; 670; 570; 514; 483; 413; 401; 398; 392; 388; 383; 377; 371; 364; 357; 350; 342; 334; List; The Soviet Union; 403; 1960s Values; Thin Copper Foil*: 126.8; 202.3; 295.9; 400.2; List	293; 573; 873 1; 5; 10; 20; 30; 40; 50; 60; 70; 80; 90; 100; 200; 273; 300; 400; 500; 600; 700; 800; 900; 1000; 1100; 1200; 1300 273.15 0.427; 0.671; 0.981; 1.322	59,170,000 - 59,590,000 Formula Values: 6.37 ⋅ 10^{7} at 273.15 K; 5.71 ⋅ 10^{7} at 300K; 4.15 ⋅ 10^{7} at 400K.	International Annealed Copper Standard (IACS) pure =1.7×10^{−8}Ω•m =58.82×10^{6}Ω^{−1}•m^{−1} For main article, see: Copper in heat exchangers. The TPRC recommended values are for well annealed 99.999% pure copper with residual electrical resistivity of ρ_{0}=0.000851 μΩ⋅cm. TPRC Data Series volume 1 page 81.: Out of 138 samples in the TPRC Data Series on the thermal conductivity of copper there is only one foil and that one was only measured at very low temperatures where other coppers also demonstrated extreme deviance. The blurred up reference to it on page 1465 looks like Landenfeld, P., Lynton, E.A. and Souten, R., Phys. Letters, Volume 19 page 265, 1965.
Cork	0.04 - 0.07; 1940s values: Density=0.195 g cm^{−3} L 0.0381; 0.0446; Density=0.104 g cm^{−3} L 0.0320; 0.0400; List: Rowley, F.B. and others in TPRC II page 1064 & 1067 curves 1 & 3 ref 109.	293 --- 222.0; 305.5 222.0; 305.5		1940s values are for oven dried cork at specified densities: Rowley, F.B., Jordan, R.C. and Lander, R.M., Refrigeration Engineering, 53, 35–9. 1947, TPRC pages 1064, 1067 & 1161.
Cotton or Plastic Insulation-foamed	0.03	293		
Diamond, impure	1,000	273 - 293	1×10^{−16}~	Type I (98.1% of Gem Diamonds) (C+0.1%N)
Diamond, natural	2,200	293	1×10^{−16}~	Type IIa (99%^{12}C and 1%^{13}C)
Diamond, isotopically enriched	3,320-41,000 (99.999% ^{12}C calc.200,000)	293-104 (~80)	(Lateral)10^{−16} - (Ballistic)10^{8}	Type IIa isotopically enriched (>99.9%^{12}C)
Dolomite, NTS dolomite	Specimen No. 1 R 1.08; 1.14; Specimen No. 2 R 1.27; 1.26; List TPRC 2 pp 811–12.	521; 835 523; 833		Specimen No. 1 had a fine-grained appearance; 2.25 inches O.D.. 0.375 in. I.D., 12 in. long; obtained from exploratory dolomite hole No. 1, dolomite hill at level of 200 feet; density 2.80 g cm^{−3}. Method: Radial heat flow [TPRC Volume 1 page 23a]. Stephens, D. R., USAEC UCRL — 7605. 1–19, 1963 in TPRC Data Series Volume 2, pp. 811–12.
Epoxy, thermally conductive	0.682 - 1.038 - 1.384 - 4.8			
Eclogite	Roberston Eclogite, 5MPa; 0.6437; 0.2574; List from graph: Roberston page 39	373; 573		Some more recent measurements about ecolgite at high pressures and elevated temperatures (up to 14GPa and 1000K) have been reported by Chao Wang and others in a 2014 article about omphacite, jadeite and diopside which is free on the internet
Ethylene glycol	TPRC; 0.2549; 0.2563; 0.2576; 0.2590; 0.2603; 0.2616; 0.2630; 0.2643; List; CRC; 0.2645; 0.2609; 0.2695; List	280; 290; 300; 310; 320; 330; 340; 350 288.15; 293.15; 353.15		The TPRC values are posted in Volume 3 on page 177 and the CRC estimates are found in the handbook on page E-4.
Expanded polystyrene – EPS	0.03-0.033 ((PS Only)0.1-0.13)	98-298 (296)	1×10^{−14}	(PS+Air+CO_{2}+C_{n}H_{2n+x})
Extruded polystyrene – XPS	0.029 - 0.39	98-298		
Fat	Beef fat 0.354; 0.175; Bone fat 0.186; Pig fat 0.238; List	293.2; 333.2 293.2 293.2		The fats were discovered by Lapshin A. and Myasnaya Ind., SSSR. Volume 25 (2) pp. 55–6, 1954. and reported in volume two of the TPRC Data Series on page 1072.
Fiberglass or foam-glass	0.045	293		
Gabbro	Sligachan Gabbro; 2.55; 2.47; List; Generic Gabbro*; 2.06 ± 0.2; List: Birch and Clark in Robertson page 31	309.4; 323.1 300		Specimen 5 cm in diameter and 2 cm long from Sligachan Skye, density 3.1 g ⋅ cm^{−1}. Nancarrow, H.A., Proc. Phys. Soc. (London) 45, page 447–61, 1933 in TPRC Data Series Volume 2 page 816.: This summary came from three samples in 1940.
Gallium arsenide	56	300		
Gasket	Cardboard; 0.210; Transite P 0.770; 0.757; 0.749; 0.742; 0.739; 0.736; 0.736; 0.736; 0.733; 0.731; List: Smith, W.K. in TPRC II page 1107 curve 1 ref 390.	291.15 338.7; 366.5; 394.3; 422.1; 449.8; 477.6; 505.4; 533.2; 560.9; 588.7		The cardboard is in Yarwood and Castle on page 36 and the Transite is credited to some W.K. Smith, NOTS TP2624, 1 — 10, 1961. [AD 263771]. Transite was discovered in 1961 and is a type of asbestos — cement board with a density of 0.193 — 0.1918 grams⋅cm^{−1}. TPRC Data Series, Volume 2, page 1107 For rubber gasket see Rubber.
Glass	0.8-0.93 (SiO_{2}pure1-SiO_{2}96%1.2-1.4); Pyrex 7740, Air Force, 1961 P 1.35; 1.34; 1.39; 1.42; 1.59; 1.45; 1.43; 1.56; 1.66; 1.68; 1.91; 1.90; List: TPRC II pages 926-9 curve 81 Pyrex 7740, NBS, 1963 L 1.11; 1.16; 1.22; 1.27; 1.33; 1.38; 1.43; List: TPRC II pages 926-9 curve 76 Pyrex 7740, NBS, 1966; 0.58; 0.90; 1.11; 1.25; 1.36; 1.50; 1.62; 1.89; List	293 297; 300; 306; 319; 322; 322; 329; 330; 332; 336; 345; 356 273.2; 323.2; 373.2; 423.2; 473.2; 523.2; 573.2 100; 200; 300; 400; 500; 600; 700; 800	10^{−14}-10^{−12}-10^{−10}	<1% Iron oxides In 1966 Pyrex 7740 had a composition of about 80.6% SiO_{2}, 13% B_{2}O_{3}, 4.3% Na_{2}O and 2.1% Al_{2}O_{3}. Similar glasses have a coefficient of linear expansion of about 3 parts per million per Kelvin at 20°Celsius. Density [Pyrex 774] ≈ 2.210 g ⋅ cm^{−3} at 32 °F. Specific heats: 0.128, 0.172, 0.202, 0.238, 0.266, 0.275 Cal. g^{−1} K^{−1} at 199.817, 293.16, 366.49, 477.60, 588.72 & 699.83 Kelvins respectively. Lucks, C.F., Deem, H.W. and Wood, W.D. in TPRC V pages 1232-3 Errata: The numbered references in the NSRDS-NBS-8 pdf are found near the end of the TPRC Data Book Volume 2 and not somewhere in Volume 3 like it says.
Glycerol	0.285-0.29	300-293		
Gold, pure	314-315-318; 1970s values: 444; 885; 2820; 1500; 345; 327; 318; 315; 312; 309; 304; 298; 292; 285; List	293-298 1; 2; 10; 20; 100; 200; 273.2; 300; 400; 500; 600; 700; 800; 900	45,170,000 - 45,450,000	1970s values are found on page 137, TPRC Data Series volume 1 (1970).
Granite	1.73 - 3.98; Nevada Granite R 1.78; 1.95; 1.86; 1.74; 1.80; Scottish Granite L 3.39; 3.39; List; Westerly Granite; 2.4(63); 2.2(83); 2.1(44); Barre Granite; 2.8(23); 2.5(18); 2.3(10); Rockport-1*; 3.5(57); 3.0(31); 2.7(12); Rockport-2*; 3.8(07); 3.2(11); 2.8(37); List: Birch and Clark in Robertson page 35.	368; 523; 600; 643; 733 306.9; 320.2 273.15; 373.15; 473.15 273.15; 373.15; 473.15 273.15; 373.15; 473.15 273.15; 373.15; 473.15		(72%SiO_{2}+14%Al_{2}O_{3}+4%K_{2}O etc.) Scottish Granite: This is granite from May Quarry in Aberdeenshire. Nancarrow, H. A., Proc. Phys. Soc. (London). 45, 447–61, 1933, TPRC II pages 818 and 1172. Nevada Granite: This granite is 34%_{v} plagioclase, 28%_{v} ortheoclase, 27%_{v} quartz and 9%_{v} biotite. Stephens, D. R., USAEC UCRL-7605, 1–19, 1963, TPRC II pages 818 and 1172. A 1960 report on the Nevada granite (Izett, USGS) is posted on the internet but the very small numbers there are hard to understand.: Robertson says that Rockport-1 has 25% Quartz and Rockport-2 has 33% Quartz and he usually talks in volume percent. Robertson page 35.
Granite, ΔP	Barre Granite*; Wet; 50 bar* 2.8; 2.5; 2.3; 2.1; 1000 bar 3.2; 2.8; 2.6; 2.4; 5000 bar 4.5; 4.0; 3.7; 3.4 Dry; 50 bar 2.8(23); 2.5(18); 2.3(10); 2.1(44); 1000 bar 2.8(76); 2.5(65); 2.3(53); 2.1(84); 5000 bar 3.0(91); 2.7(57); 2.5(29); 2.3(47); List: Robertson pages 35, 59-61	273.15; 373.15; 473.15; 573.15 273.15; 373.15; 473.15; 573.15 273.15; 373.15; 473.15; 573.15 273.15; 373.15; 473.15; 573.15 273.15; 373.15; 473.15; 573.15 273.15; 373.15; 473.15; 573.15		Small granite pillars have failed under loads that averaged out to about 1.43 ⋅ 10^{8} Newtons/meter^{2} and this kind of rock has a sonic speed of about 5.6 ± 0.3 ⋅ 10^{3} m/sec (stp), a density of about 2.7 g/cm^{3} and specific heat ranging from about 0.2 to 0.3 cal/g °C through the temperature interval 100-1000 °C [Stowe pages 41 & 59 and Robertson pages 70 & 86].: In this particular case the solidity of the granite is 0.966.; A bar is 10^{5} Pa or 10^{5} Newtons/meter^{2} and pressures around 5000 bar should normally be found at depths of about 19 to 23 kilometers.
Graphene	(4840±440) - (5300±480)	293	100,000,000	
Graphite, natural	25-470; 146-246 (longitudinal), 92-175 (radial)	293	5,000,000-30,000,000	
Grease, thermally conductive greases	860 Silicone Heat Transfer Compound: 0.66; 8616 Super Thermal Grease II: 1.78; 8617 Super thermal Grease III: 1.0; List, MG Chemicals	233.15—473.15 205.15—438.15 205.15—438.15	These thermal greases have low electrical conductivity and their volume resistivities are 1.5⋅10^{15}, 1.8⋅10^{11}, and 9.9⋅10^{9} Ω⋅cm for 860, 8616 and 8617 respectively.	The thermal grease 860 is a silicone oil with a Zinc Oxide filler and 8616 and 8617 are synthetic oils with various fillers including Aluminum Oxide and Boron Nitride. At 25 °C the densities are 2.40, 2.69 and 1.96 g/mL for the greases 860, 8616 and 8617 respectively.
Helium II	≳100000 in practice, phonon scattering at solid-liquid interface is main barrier to heat transfer.	2.2		Liquid helium in its superfluid state below 2.2 K
House	American 2016 Wood Product Blow-in, Attic Insulation; 0.0440 − 0.0448; FIBERGLAS Blow-in, Attic Insulation; 0.0474 − 0.0531; PINK FIBERGLAS Flexible Insulation; 0.0336 − 0.0459 British CONCRETE: General 1.28 (2300 kg/m3) 1.63 (2100 kg/m3 typical floor) 1.40 (2000 kg/m3 typical floor) 1.13 (medium 1400 kg/m3)0.51 (lightweight 1200 kg/m3) 0.38 (lightweight 600 kg/m3) 0.19 (aerated 500 kg/m3) 0.16 PLASTER: (1300 kg/m3) 0.50 (600 kg/m3) 0.16 TIMBER: Timber (650 kg/m3) 0.14; Timber flooring (650 kg/m3) 0.14; Timber rafters 0.13; Timber floor joists 0.13 MISC.: Calcium silicate board (600 kg/m3) 0.17; Expanded polystyrene 0.030 −0.038; Plywood (950 kg/m3) 0.16; Rock mineral wool 0.034 −0.042; List; Wallboard, see Wallboard. 1960s Values Dry Zero − Kapok between burlap or paper density 0.016 g cm^{−3}, TC=0.035 W⋅m^{−1}K^{−1} Hair Felt − Felted cattle hair density 0.176 g cm^{−3}, TC=0.037 W⋅m^{−1}K^{−1} density 0.208 g cm^{−3}, TC=0.037 W⋅m^{−1}K^{−1} Balsam Wool − Chemically treated wood fibre density 0.035 g cm^{−3}, TC=0.039 W⋅m^{−1}K^{−1} Hairinsul − 50% hair 50% jute density 0.098 g cm^{−3}, TC=0.037 W⋅m^{−1}K^{−1} Rock Wool − Fibrous material made from rock density 0.096 g cm^{−3}, TC=0.037 W⋅m^{−1}K^{−1} density 0.160 g cm^{−3}, TC=0.039 W⋅m^{−1}K^{−1} density 0.224 g cm^{−3}, TC=0.040 W⋅m^{−1}K^{−1} Glass Wool − Pyrex glass curled density 0.064 g cm^{−3}, TC=0.042 W⋅m^{−1}K^{−1} density 0.160 g cm^{−3}, TC=0.042 W⋅m^{−1}K^{−1} Corkboard − No added binder density 0.086 g cm^{−3}, TC=0.036 W⋅m^{−1}K^{−1} density 0.112 g cm^{−3}, TC=0.039 W⋅m^{−1}K^{−1} density 0.170 g cm^{−3}, TC=0.043 W⋅m^{−1}K^{−1} density 0.224 g cm^{−3}, TC=0.049 W⋅m^{−1}K^{−1} Corkboard − with asphaltic binder density 0.232 g cm^{−3}, TC=0.046 W⋅m^{−1}K^{−1} Cornstalk Pith Board: 0.035 − 0.043 Cypress density 0.465 g cm^{−3}, TC=0.097 W⋅m^{−1}K^{−1} White pine density 0.513 g cm^{−3}, TC=0.112 W⋅m^{−1}K^{−1} Mahogany density 0.545 g cm^{−3}, TC=0.123 W⋅m^{−1}K^{−1} Virginia pine density 0.545 g cm^{−3}, TC=0.141 W⋅m^{−1}K^{−1} Oak density 0.609 g cm^{−3}, TC=0.147 W⋅m^{−1}K^{−1} Maple density 0.705 g cm^{−3}, TC=0.159 W⋅m^{−1}K^{−1} List			American 2016: Flexible insulation from Owens Corning includes faced and unfaced rolls of glass wool and with foil. 1960s values: All thermal conductivities from Cypress to Maple are given across the grain.
Hydrogen	0.1819	290		Hydrogen gas at room temperature.
Ice	1.6-2.1-2.2-2.22 The Historic Ice Authorities van Duser 1929; 2.09; 2.161; 2.232; 2.303; 2.374; 2.445 Choi & Okos/Bonales 1956 — 2017; 2.2199; 2.3854; 2.6322; 2.9603; 3.3695; 3.8601 Ratcliffe/Bonales 1962 — 2017; 2.0914; 2.2973; 2.5431; 2.8410; 3.2086; 3.6723; List Clark, S.P. Jr., 1966*; 2.092; 2.552; List: Clark, S.P. Jr. in Robertson p. 58	293 - 273 273.15; 253.15; 233.15; 213.15; 193.15; 173.15 273.15; 253.15; 233.15; 213.15; 193.15; 173.15 273.15; 253.15; 233.15; 213.15; 193.15; 173.15 273.15; 143.15		Bonales says that his posted formulas are lined up with his old authorities though more recent ones (and Bonales among them) have come to believe that ices that come to low temperatures remember a cooling rate. The formulas are: 1)van Duser: k=2.09(1–0.0017 T(°C)); 2)Choi & Okos: k=2.2199-6.248 ⋅ 10^{−3} T(°C) + 1.0154 ⋅ 10^{−4} T(°C)^{2}; 3)Ratcliffe: k=2135 T(K)^{−1.235}. k is given in w ⋅ m^{−1} ⋅ K^{−1}. Errata: Contrary to what they say the formula of Bonales and Sanz cannot be fitted to their data and also it is not consistent with the results of Choi and Okos since their formula is a typo and also Choi and Okos did not cook up a linear function to start with. Instead the formula that would fit some of the Bonales data is k ≈ 2.0526 - 0.0176TC and not k = -0.0176 + 2.0526T as they say on page S615 and also the values they posted for Alexiades and Solomon do not fit the other formula that they posted on table 1 on page S611 and the formula that would fit over there is k = 2.18 - 0.01365TC and not k = 2.18 - 0.01365TK.: The Clark Ice has a density of 0.9 g/cm^{−3}. Robertson page 58.
Indium phosphide	80	300		
Insulating firebrick	Sheffield Pottery, 2016: NC-23; 0.19; 0.20; 0.23; 0.26; NC-26; 0.25; 0.26; 0.27; 0.30; NC-28; 0.29; 0.32; 0.33; 0.36; List; 1940s Blast Furnace: 1.58; 1.55; 1.53; List	533; 811; 1089; 1366 533; 811; 1089; 1366 533; 811; 1089; 1366 636.2; 843.2; 1036.2		Sheffield pottery: Standard ASTM 155 Grades, 05/10/2006: NC-23, Cold Crushing Strength=145 lbs/inch2, density=36 lbs/ft3 NC-26, Cold Crushing Strength=220 lbs/inch2, density=46 lbs/ft3 NC-28, Cold Crushing Strength=250 lbs/inch2, density=55 lbs/ft3 --- 1940s Blast Furnace: Kolechkova, A. F. and Goncharov, V. V., Ogneupory, 14, 445–53, 1949, TPRC pages 488, 493 & 1161.
Iron, pure	71.8-72.7-79.5-80-80.2-80.4; 55.4; 34.6 TPRC; 149; 224; 297; 371; 442; 513; 580; 645; 705; 997; 814; 555; 372; 265; 204; 168; 146; 132; 94; 83.5; 80.3; 69.4; 61.3; 54.7; 48.7; 43.3; 38.0; 32.6; 29.7; 29.9; 27.9; 28.2; 29.9; 30.9; 31.8; List The Soviet Union; 86.5	293-298-300; 573; 1273 2; 3; 4; 5; 6; 7; 8; 9; 10; 20; 30; 40; 50; 60; 70; 80; 90; 100; 200; 273.2; 300; 400; 500; 600; 700; 800; 900; 1000; 1100; 1183; 1183; 1200; 1300; 1400; 1500 273.15	9,901,000 - 10,410,000	The TPRC recommended values are for well annealed 99.998% pure iron with residual electrical resistivity of ρ_{0}=0.0327 μΩ⋅cm. TPRC Data Series volume 1 page 169.
Iron, cast	55 Tadokoro Cast Iron* White; 12.8; 13.3; 14.3; 14.5; 17.3 Grey; 29.5; 29.7; 30.0; 30.1; 31.1; List: Tadokoro, curves 39 & 40 in TPRC Vol. I, pp 1130–31 Donaldson Cast Iron* 48.5; 48.1; 46.9; 47.3; 46.9; 46.0; List: Donaldson, curve 1 in TPRC Vol. I, pp 1129 & 1131	298 303.2; 323.2; 362.2; 373.2; 425.2 303.2; 323.2; 361.2; 373.2; 427.2 353.70; 376.70; 418.20; 429.70; 431.70; 447.20		(Fe+(2–4)%C+(1–3)%Si) Apart from a thermal conductivity a boiler company also has an interface heat transfer coefficient Q and also some Kurganov has posted this simplification that water flowing in tubes has Q ≈ 500 - 1200 W/(m^{2}K).: These Tadokoro Irons are 3.02% C, 0.089% Cu, 0.53% Mn, 0.567% P, 0.074% S, 0.57% Si and 3.08% C, 0.136% Cu, 0.44% Mn, 0.540% P, .074% S and 0.58% Si, White Cast and Grey Cast respectively.; By comparison the Donaldson Iron is 2.80% C, 0.10% Mn, 0.061% P, 0.093% S and 0.39% Si. It has 0.76% graphitic carbon and 2.04% combined carbon and the thermal conductivity measurements come with a 2% error estimate. Tadokoro, Y., J., Iron Steel Inst. (Japan), 22, 399 — 424, 1936 and Donaldson, J.W., J. Iron Steel Inst. (London), 128, p. 255-76, 1933.
Laminates, metal non-metal	Taylor I 30 varnished silicon steel foils each of thickness 0.014 inches (0.356 mm): density 7.36 g cm^{−3}; measured near a temperature of 358.2 K under pressure in the range 0 — 132 psi: 0 psi 0.512 w m^{−1} K^{−1} 20 psi 0.748; 40 psi 0.846; 60 psi 0.906; 80 psi 0.925; 100 psi 0.965; 120 psi 0.992; 132 psi 1.02; 120 psi 1.00; 100 psi NA*; 80 psi 0.984; 60 psi 0.945; 40 psi 0.906; 20 psi 0.846; 0 psi 0.591; Taylor II; 30 varnished silicon steel foils each of thickness 0.0172 inches (0.4368 mm); density 7.51 g cm^{−3}; measured near a temperature of 358.2 K under pressure in the range 0 — 128 psi: 0 psi 0.433 w m^{−1} K^{−1} 20 psi 0.807; 40 psi 0.965; 60 psi 1.04; 80 psi 1.10; 100 psi 1.18; 120 psi 1.24; 128 psi 1.26; 120 psi 1.26; 100 psi 1.22; 80 psi 1.18; 60 psi 1.14; 40 psi 1.10; 20 psi 0.984; 0 psi 0.630; Taylor III; 30 silicon steel foils each of thickness 0.0172 inches (0.4368 mm); density 7.79 g cm^{−3}; measured near a temperature of 358.2 K under pressure in the range 0 — 125 psi: 0 psi 0.496 w m^{−1} K^{−1} 10 psi 0.748; 22.5 psi 0.945; 125 psi 1.65; 100 psi 1.59; 80 psi 1.54; 47 psi 1.38; 20 psi 1.14; 0 psi 0.709; List: Taylor, T.S., Elec. World, 76 (24), 1159 — 62, 1920.			*The report in the Data Series says that the Taylor I laminate had a thermal conductivity of 0.0996 w cm^{−1} K^{−1} at 100 psi in descent and that is an obvious typo [NA]. What would fit is 0.00996 w cm^{−1} K^{−1} = 0.996 w m^{−1} K^{−1}. TPRC Volume 2, pp 1037–9.
Lead, pure	34.7-35.0-35.3; 29.8 TPRC; 2770; 4240; 3400; 2240; 1380; 820; 490; 320; 230; 178; 146; 123; 107; 94; 84; 77; 66; 59; 50.7; 47.7; 45.1; 43.5; 39.6; 36.6; 35.5; 35.2; 33.8; 32.5; 31.2; List The Soviet Union; 35.6	293-298-300; 573 1; 2; 3; 4; 5; 6; 7; 8; 9; 10; 11; 12; 13; 14; 15; 16; 18; 20; 25; 30; 40; 50; 100; 200; 273.2; 300; 400; 500; 600 273.15	4,808,000 - 4,854,000	The TPRC List is the TPRC estimate for well annealed Lead of 99.99+% purity and residual electrical resistivity ρ_{0}=0.000880 μΩ cm. TPRC Data Series Volume 1, page 191. This material is superconductive (electrical) at temperatures below 7.193 Kelvins. Weast page E-87.
Limestone	1.26 - 1.33; Indiana Limestone R 1.19; 1.21; 1.19; 1.11; 1.12; 1.07; 1.03; 0.62; 0.57; 0.54; List; Queenstone Grey L 1.43; 1.41; 1.40; 1.33; List1.43; Generic Limestone R* Air in Pores; Solidity = 1.0: K = 2.67*; Solidity = 0.9: K = 2.17; Solidity = 0.8: K = 1.72; Solidity = 0.7: K = 1.32 Water in Pores; Solidity = 1.0: K = 2.97; Solidity = 0.9: K = 2.52; Solidity = 0.8: K = 2.12; Solidity = 0.7: K = 1.77; List: Robertson formula 6 and page 10&16.	---- 472; 553; 683; 813; 952; 1013; 1075; 1181; 1253; 1324 395.9; 450.4; 527.6; 605.4 300		Mostly CaCO_{3} and the "Indiana Limestone" is 98.4% CaCO_{3}, 1% quartz and 0.6% hematite. By comparison Queenstone Grey is a mixture of dolomite and calcite containing 22% MgCO_{2}. Density=2.675 g cm^{−3}. Niven, C.D., Can J. Research, A18, 132–7, 1940, TPRC pages 821 and 1170.: Generic Limestone R is relatively pure polycrystaline calcite, solidity is the quotient of the solid grain volume divided by the bulk volume and K is thermal conductivity in W⋅m^{−1}⋅K^{−1}.
Manganese	7.81			lowest thermal conductivity of any pure metal
Marble	2.07-2.08-2.94	298		
Methane	0.030-0.03281	298-273		
Mineral wool insulation	0.04	293-298		
Nickel	90.9-91	298		
Nitrogen, pure	0.0234-0.024-0.02583-0.026	293-298-300		(N_{2}) (1 atm)
Norite	2.7 ± 0.4; List: Misener and others in Robertson page 31.	300		This summary came from five samples in 1951.
Oxygen, pure (gas)	0.0238-0.024-0.0263-0.02658	293-298-300		(O_{2}) (1 atm)
Oil	Transformer Oil; CRC Oil; Regular; 0.177; Light Heat; 0.132; List; Yarwood and Castle; 0.135	343.15 — 373.15 303.15 — 373.15 273.15		Yarwood and Castle have their transformer oil on page 37.
Paper	Ordinary Paper; Engineeringtoolbox; 0.05; Yarwood and Castle; 0.125; Oil Impregnated Paper; 0.180 — 0.186	298 291.15 294.7 — 385.2		The oil-impregnated paper was about 0.05 inches thick and it was loaded under about 2 PSI. TPRC Volume 2, page 1127. Yarwood and Castle has the thermal conductivity of their paper on page 36
Perlite, (1 atm)	0.031	298		
Perlite in partial vacuum	0.00137	298		
Pine	0.0886; 0.0913; 0.0939; 0.0966; 0.0994; 0.102; List	222.0; 238.7; 255.4; 272.2; 288.9; 305.5		Density=0.386 g cm^{−3}. Rowley, F. B., Jordan, R. C. and Lander, R. M., Refrigeration Engineering, 53, 35–9, 1947, TPRC pages 1083 and 1161.
Plastic, fiber-reinforced	0.23 - 0.7 - 1.06	293 - 296	10^{−15} - 10^{0}	10-40%GF or CF
Polyethylene, high-density	0.42 - 0.51	298		
Polymer, high-density	0.33 - 0.52	296	10^{−16} - 10^{2}	
Polymer, low-density	0.04 - 0.16 - 0.25 - 0.33	293 - 296	10^{−17} - 10^{0}	
Polyurethane foam	0.03	298		
Porcelain, electrical porcelain	1940s Values; Sample 1; 1.90 — 2.27; Sample 2; 1.40 — 2.15; Sample 3; 1.84 — 2.24	388.2 — 1418.2 395.2 — 1456.2 385.2 — 1396.2		Starting material was 19.0 flint, 37.0 feldspar, 7.0 Edgar plastic kaolin, 22.0 Edgar Nocarb clay, and 15.0 Kentucky old mine No. 4 ball clay, ball milled for 15 hours, slip cast and fired to 1250 °C; 25% open pores; bulk density 2.5 g ⋅ cm^{−3}. Norton, F.H. and Kingery, W.D., USAEC Rept. NYO — 601, 1 — 52, 1943 in TPRC Vol. 2 page 937
Propylene glycol	0.2007	293.15 — 353.15		This hearsay value is posted in the 48th Edition of the Handbook of Chemistry and Physics on page E-4.
Pyroxenite	4.3 ± 0.1; List: Birch and Clark in Robertson, page 31.	300		This summary came from 2 samples in 1940.
Quartz, single crystal	12 $\parallel$ to c axis, 06.8 $\perp$ to c axis Rutgers University; 11.1 $\parallel$ to c axis, 5.88 $\perp$ to c axis 9.34 $\parallel$ to c axis, 5.19 $\perp$ to c axis 8.68 $\parallel$ to c axis, 4.50 $\perp$ to c axis List; NBS; 6.00 $\parallel$ to c axis, 3.90 $\perp$ to c axis 5.00 $\parallel$ to c axis, 3.41 $\perp$ to c axis 4.47 $\parallel$ to c axis, 3.12 $\perp$ to c axis 4.19 $\parallel$ to c axis, 3.04 $\perp$ to c axis List	300 311; 366; 422 500; 600; 700; 800		The noted authorities have reported some values in three digits as cited here in metric translation but they have not demonstrated three digit measurement. Errata: The numbered references in the NSRDS-NBS-8 pdf are found near the end of the TPRC Data Book Volume 2 and not somewhere in Volume 3 like it says.
Quartz, fused, or vitreous silica, or fused silica	1.46-3; 1.4; England; 0.84; 1.05; 1.20; 1.32; 1.41; 1.48; List; America; 0.52; 1.13; 1.23; 1.40; 1.42; 1.50; 1.53; 1.59; 1.73; 1.92; 2.17; 2.48; 2.87; 3.34; 4.00; 4.80; 6.18; List	293; 323 123; 173; 223; 273; 323; 373 100; 200; 223; 293; 323; 373; 400; 500; 600; 700; 800; 900; 1000; 1100; 1200; 1300; 1400	1.333E-18 - 10^{−16}	
Quartz, powdered	Kozak 1952; 0.184; 0.209; 0.230; 0.259; Sinel'nikov 1958; 0.0289; 0.0335; 0.0356; 0.041; 0.0448; 0.0515; 0.0669; 0.0753; 0.0812; 0.0837; List: TPRC II pages 177-180	373.2; 483.2; 588.2; 673.2 313.2; 373.2; 473.2; 571.2; 617.2; 667.2; 713.2; 811.2; 863.2; 868.2		Kozak grain sizes ranged from 0.3 to 1 mm diameter and the density was 0.54 grams ⋅ cm^{−3}. Kozak, M.I. Zhur. Tekh. Fiz., 22 (1), 73–6, 1952. By comparison Sinel'nikov powder is a powder in a vacuum, gran sizes range from 100 to 200 micrometers, the powder density is 1.35 g per cm^{−3}. Sinel'nikov, N.N. and Filipovich, V.N., Soviet Phys. Tech., 3, 193–6, 1958. The TPRC record is blurred up some on the Sinel'nikov vacuum which looks like it is probably 5 ⋅ 10^{−5} mmHg. TPRC pages 177–180, Volume 2, curves 62 and 65, Reference numbers 326 and 327 respectively.
Quartz, slip-cast	First Run; 0.34; 0.39; 0.45; 0.51; 0.62; Second Run; 0.63; 0.66; 0.69; List	500; 700; 900; 1100; 1300 900; 1000; 1100		This material which must have started out like unfired pottery was slip cast from fused silica. Then it was dried four days at 333 K before being tested. It was 9 inches in diameter and 1 inch thick, density 1.78 ⋅ cm^{−3}. The first run went to 1317K and then on the second run the same insulator proved to be more conductive. 1959.
Redwood bark	Whole: Density=0.0641 g cm^{−3} L 0.0286; 0.0307; 0.0330; 0.0356; 0.0379; 0.0407; Shredded: Density=0.0625 g cm^{−3} L 0.0107; List	222.2; 239.2; 255.5; 272.1; 288.8; 305.3 318.7		Whole: Rowley, F. B., Jordan, R. C. and Lander, R. M., Refrig. Eng., 50, 541–4, 1945, TPRC pages 1084 & 1172. Shredded: Wilkes, G. B., Refrig. Eng., 52, 37–42, 1946, TPRC pages 1084 & 1162.
Rice hulls (ash)	0.062			
Rice hulls (whole)	0.0359			
Rock, felsic igneous	Air in Pores, 5 MPa* Solidity* = 1 20%_{v} Quartz: 2.21; 40%_{v} Quartz: 2.97; 60%_{v} Quartz: 3.72 Solidity = 0.9 20%_{v} Quartz: 1.80; 40%_{v} Quartz: 2.41; 60%_{v} Quartz: 3.02 Water in Pores, 5 MPa Solidity = 1 20%_{v} Quartz: 2.83; 40%_{v} Quartz: 4.14; 60%_{v} Quartz: 5.46 Solidity = 0.9 20%_{v} Quartz: 2.41; 40%_{v} Quartz: 3.47; 60%_{v} Quartz: 4.54; List: Formula values (6), page 10, Robertson.	300		*5 MPa is 5 ⋅ 10^{6} Pascals or 5 ⋅ 10^{6} Newtons per meter^{2} or about fifty atmospheres pressure. *Solidity ≡ the ratio of the volume of solid to the bulk volume, or the ratio of bulk density to solid grain density d_{B}/d_{G}. Symbols: %_{v} is percent by volume.
Rock, mafic igneous	Air in Pores, 5 MPa Solidity = 1 0 %_{v} OPA*: 1.50; 5 %_{v} OPA : 1.58; 10%_{v} OPA: 1.65; 20%_{v} OPA: 1.80; 30%_{v} OPA: 1.95 Solidity = 0.9 0 %_{v} OPA : 1.25; 5 %_{v} OPA : 1.31; 10%_{v} OPA: 1.37; 20%_{v} OPA: 1.49; 30%_{v} OPA: 1.62 Water in Pores, 5 MPa Solidity = 1 0 %_{v} OPA : 1.84; 5 %_{v} OPA : 1.96; 10%_{v} OPA: 2.09; 20%_{v} OPA: 2.34; 30%_{v} OPA: 2.59 Solidity = 0.9 0 %_{v} OPA : 1.63; 5 %_{v} OPA : 1.73; 10%_{v} OPA: 1.83; 20%_{v} OPA: 2.04; 30%_{v} OPA: 2.24; List: Formula values (6), page 10, Robertson.	300		*OPA is olivine, pyroxene and/or amphibole in any proportions.
Rubber	CRC Rubber, 92%, nd 0.16 Griffiths Natural Rubber 1923 0.134 Hayes Synthetic Rubbers 1960 Thiokel ST 0.268 Kel-F 3700 0.117; 0.113; 0.113; 0.113 Carboxy Rubber, Firestone butaprene T 0.255; 0.238; 0.197; List Griffiths and Hayes curves 11, 41, 43 & 56 in TPRC II pp 981–984	303 298.2 310.9 310.9; 422.1; 477.6; 533.2 310.9; 422.1; 477.6	1×10^{−13}~	The Listed Synthetic Rubbers and more of them in the data collection are credited to Hayes, R.A., Smith, F.M., Kidder, G.A., Henning, J.C., Rigby, J.D. and Hall, G.L., WADC TR 56-331 (Pt.4), 1–157, 1960 [AD 240 212].
Sand, Hudson River	0.27; List: Robertson page 58	303.15		This sample has a density of 1.36 g/cm^{3}.
Sandstone	1.83 - 2.90; 2.1 - 3.9			~95-71%SiO_{2} ~98-48%SiO_{2}, ~16-30% Porosity
Silica aerogel	0.003 (carbon black9%~0.0042)-0.008-0.017-0.02-0.03	98 - 298		Foamed glass
Silver, pure	406-407-418; 427-429-430; 1970s values: TPRC; 3940; 7830; 17200; 16800; 5100; 1930; 1050; 700; 550; 497; 471; 460; 450; 432; 430; 428; 427; 420; 413; 405; 397; 389; 382; List; The Soviet Union; 429	293; 298-300 1; 2; 5; 10; 20; 30; 40; 50; 60; 70; 80; 90; 100; 150; 200; 273.2; 300; 400; 500; 600; 700; 800; 900 273.15	61,350,000 - 63,010,000	Highest electrical conductivity of any metal TPRC recommended values are for well annealed 99.999% pure silver with residual electrical resistivity of ρ_{0}=0.000620 μΩ⋅cm. TPRC Data Series volume 1 page 348 (1970).
Silver, sterling	361			
Snow, dry	0.05-0.11-0.25	273		
Sodium chloride	35.1 - 6.5 - 4.85	80 - 289 - 400		
Soil, dry with organic matter	0.15-1.15-2	293		composition may vary
Soil, saturated	0.6-4	293		composition may vary
Soils, temperate	Andersland Soils Sandy Soils Dry Density= 1200 kg ⋅ meter^{−3} 20% Saturation: K= 0.90 W ⋅ m^{−1} ⋅ K^{−1} 40% Saturation: K= 1.05; 60% Saturation: K= 1.15; 80% Saturation: K= 1.20 Dry Density= 1400 kg ⋅ meter^{−3} 20% Saturation: K= 1.09; 40% Saturation: K= 1.30; 60% Saturation: K= 1.44; 80% Saturation: K= 1.54 Dry Density= 1600 kg ⋅ meter^{−3} 20% Saturation: K= 1.29; 40% Saturation: K= 1.58; 60% Saturation: K= 1.76; 80% Saturation: K= 1.88 Dry Density= 1800 kg ⋅ meter^{−3} 20% Saturation: K= 1.50; 40% Saturation: K= 1.90; 60% Saturation: K= 2.15; 80% Saturation: K= 2.31 Silt and Clay Soils Dry Density= 1200 kg ⋅ meter^{−3} 20% Saturation: K= 0.54 W ⋅ m^{−1} ⋅ K^{−1} 40% Saturation: K= 0.76; 60% Saturation: K= 0.90; 80% Saturation: K= 1.00 Dry Density= 1400 kg ⋅ meter^{−3} 20% Saturation: K= 0.59; 40% Saturation: K= 0.86; 60% Saturation: K= 1.04; 80% Saturation: K= 1.15 Dry Density= 1600 kg ⋅ meter^{−3} 20% Saturation: K= 0.61; 40% Saturation: K= 1.00; 60% Saturation: K= 1.23; 80% Saturation: K= 1.39 Dry Density= 1800 kg ⋅ meter^{−3} 20% Saturation: K= 0.65; 40% Saturation: K= 1.08; 60% Saturation: K= 1.39; 80% Saturation: K= 1.62 Charts: Andersland and Anderson in Farouki, figures 152 page 106 and 148 on page 104 de Vries Soils Mineral; density 2.65 g cm^{−3}: K = 2.93; Organic; density 1.3 g cm^{−3}: K = 0.251; Soil, mineral, dry; density 1.50 g cm^{−3}: K = 0.209; Soil, mineral, saturated; density 1.93 g cm^{−3}: K = 2.09; Soil, organic, dry; density 0.13 g cm^{−3}: K = 0.033; Soil, organic, sat.; density 1.03 g cm^{−3}: K = 0.502; List Higashi Soil With Water r* Loose Packed r = 0.0: K= 0.255 W ⋅ m^{−1} ⋅ K^{−1} r = 0.2: K= 0.534 r = 0.4: K= 0.883 r = 0.6: K= 1.162 Close Packed r = 0.0: K= 0.372 r = 0.2: K= 0.697 r = 0.4: K= 1.127 r = 0.6: K= 1.627; List: Higashi, Akira; Hokkaido University Library Kersten Soils Silt-Clay Soils; 1.28 grams ⋅ cm^{−3} dry 50% Saturation: K = 0.89 W ⋅ m^{−1} ⋅ K^{−1} 100% Saturation: K = 1.1; 1.44 grams ⋅ cm^{−3} dry 50% Saturation: K = 1.0; 100% Saturation: K = 1.3; 1.60 grams ⋅ cm^{−3}dry 50% Saturation: K = 1.2; 100% Saturation: K = 1.5 Sandy Soil; 1.60 grams ⋅ cm^{−3} dry 50% Saturation: K = 1.7 W ⋅ m^{−1} ⋅ K^{−1} 100% Saturation: K = 2.0; List: Kersten in Farouki, figures 146 & 150, pp. 103 & 105	293.2 277.59		The cited Andersland Charts include corresponding water content percentages for easy measurements. The TPRC Data Book has been quoting de Vries with values of 0.0251 and 0.0109 W⋅cm^{−3}⋅Kelvin^{−1} for the thermal conductivities of organic and dry mineral soils respectively but the original article is free at the website of their cited journal. Errors: TPRC Volume 2 pages 847 and 1159. Journal archives. Also some de Vries authorities include John Webb, "Thermal Conductivity of Soil" November 1956, Nature Volume 178, pages 1074–1075, and M.W. Makowski, "Thermal Conductivity of Soil" April 1957, Nature Volume 179, pages 778-779 and more recent notables include Nan Zhang Phd and Zhaoyu Wang PhD "Review of soil thermal conductivity and predictive models" July 2017, International Journal of Thermal Sciences Volume 117 pages 172–183.: r ≡ The ratio of the water mass to the dried soil mass. Higashi Soil.
Soils, frozen, below saturation	Higashi Soils; Soil A, Black cultivated, 0 — 10 cm deep Dry: K = 0.488 W ⋅ m^{−1} ⋅ K^{−1} Saturated: K = 3.151 Soil B, Brown subsoil, 25 — 30 cm deep Dry: K = 0.232; Saturated: K = 2.604 Soil C, Yellow brown subsoil, 50 — 60 cm deep Dry: K = 0.290; Saturated: K = 2.279 List: Higashi, Hokkaido University Library Kersten Soils Sandy Soil 1.60 grams ⋅ cm^{−3} dry 50% Saturation: K = 1.7 W ⋅ m^{−1} ⋅ K^{−1} 100% Saturation: K > 3.17; List: Kersten in Farouki, figure 151 page 105.	268.15 ± 2K 269.26		Higashi anomalies: The very high c values that are labeled as thermal conductivities in table III on page 100 would roughly fit the thesis of the paper if they came with lower orders of magnitude. The way that the dry soils get a lot lighter between Table I on page 99 and table IV on pages 102-3 is eventually explained by the fact that Table I has pycnometer densities. For those who may already see reasons to learn more about the thermal conductivities of the soils it is free from the Army Cold Regions Research and Engineering Laboratory. The whole thing is on the Farouki reference footnote and it comes with graphs and with formulas. To make it easier a lb/ft^{3} is about 0.01601846 grams/cm^{3} and a Btu in./ft^{2} hr °F is about 0.14413139 W ⋅ m^{−1} ⋅ K^{−1}.
Soils, frozen, above saturation	Higashi Soils; Soil A r* = 0.7: K = 3.953 W ⋅ m^{−1} ⋅ K^{−1} Soil B r = 0.8: K = 3.348; List	268.15 ± 2K		In this sample of two there is one very dirty kind of ice that conducts heat at nearly twice the rate of plain ice. *r ≡ The ratio of the water mass to the dried mass.
Solder, Sn/63% Pb/37%	50			
Lead-free solder, Sn/95.6% Ag/3.5% Cu/0.9%, Sn/95.5% Ag/3.8% Cu/0.7% (SAC)	~60			
Steel, carbon	36-43 50.2-54 Intermediate British Steels, 1933 CS 81: 0.1% C, 0.34% Mn; 67.4; 66.1; 64.9 CS 91: 0.26% C, 0.61% Mn; 56.1; 55.2; 54.4 CS 92: 0.44% C, 0.67% Mn; 54.0; 52.7; 51.9; List: Naeser, G. in TPRC I pp 1186–90, curves 81, 91 and 92 Tool Steel, 1.41% C, 0.23% Mn, 0.158% Si L Water Quenched; 30.5; 31.0; 31.8 Tempered at 150°C and air cooled 32.2; 32.2; 32.8 Tempered at 200°C and air cooled 33.1; 33.9; 33.5 Tempered at 250°C and air cooled 36.8; 36.4; 37.2 Tempered at 300°C and air cooled 37.7; 38.5; 38.1 Tempered at 350°C and air cooled 38.1; 38.5; 38.9; List: Hattori, D., J. Iron Steel Inst. (London) 129 (1), 189–306, 1934 in TPRC I pp 1115–1120 curves 61-66	293-298 373.2; 473.2; 573.2 373.2; 473.2; 573.2 373.2; 473.2; 573.2 355.70; 374.20; 390.20 360.70; 376.70; 389.70 366.20; 401.70; 427.20 364.20; 395.70; 424.70 365.70; 393.20; 427.20 369.20; 390.70; 432.20		(Fe+(1.5-0.5)%C)
Steel, stainless	16.3-16.7-18-24	296	1,176,000 - 1,786,000	(Fe, Cr12.5-25%, Ni0-20%, Mo0-3%, Ti0-trace)
Styrofoam-expanded polystyrene	Dow Chemical 0.033-0.036; K. T. Yucel et al. 0.036-0.046			
Syenite	2.18; List: Birch and Clark in Robertson page 58	300		This summary came from one sample in 1940.
Thermal grease	0.4 - 3.0			
Thermal tape	0.60			
Thorium dioxide	3.68; 3.12; 2.84; 2.66; 2.54; List	1000; 1200; 1400; 1600; 1800		Recommended values, TPRC, Polycrystaline, 99.5% pure, 98% dense, page 198
Tin	TPRC; 20400$\perp$to the c axis, 14200 $\parallel$ to the c axis, 18300 P* 36000$\perp$to the c axis, 25000 $\parallel$ to the c axis, 32300 P 33100$\perp$to the c axis, 23000 $\parallel$ to the c axis, 29700 P 20200$\perp$to the c axis, 14000 $\parallel$ to the c axis, 18100 P 13000$\perp$to the c axis, 9000 $\parallel$ to the c axis, (11700) P 8500$\perp$to the c axis, 5900 $\parallel$ to the c axis, (7600) P 5800$\perp$to the c axis, 4000 $\parallel$ to the c axis, (5200) P 4000$\perp$to the c axis, 2800 $\parallel$ to the c axis, (3600) P 2900$\perp$to the c axis, 2010 $\parallel$ to the c axis, (2600) P 2150 $\perp$to the c axis, 1490 $\parallel$ to the c axis, (1930) P 1650$\perp$to the c axis, 1140$\parallel$ to the c axis, (1480) P 1290$\perp$to the c axis, 900 $\parallel$ to the c axis, (1160) P 1040$\perp$to the c axis, 20 $\parallel$ to the c axis, (930) P 850 $\perp$to the c axis, 590 $\parallel$ to the c axis, (760) P 700 $\perp$to the c axis, 490 $\parallel$ to the c axis, (630) P 590 $\perp$to the c axis, 410 $\parallel$ to the c axis, (530) P 450 $\perp$to the c axis, 310 $\parallel$ to the c axis, (400) P 360 $\perp$to the c axis, 250 $\parallel$ to the c axis, (320) P 250 $\perp$to the c axis, 172 $\parallel$ to the c axis, (222) P 200 $\perp$to the c axis, 136* $\parallel$ to the c axis, (176) P 167 $\perp$to the c axis, 116 $\parallel$ to the c axis, (150) P (150)$\perp$to the c axis, (104) $\parallel$ to the c axis, (133) P (137)$\perp$to the c axis, (95) $\parallel$ to the c axis, (123) P (128)$\perp$to the c axis, (89) $\parallel$ to the c axis, (115) P (107)$\perp$to the c axis, (74) $\parallel$ to the c axis, (96) P (98.0)$\perp$to the c axis, (68.0) $\parallel$ to the c axis, (88.0) P (95.0)$\perp$to the c axis, (66.0) $\parallel$ to the c axis, (85.0) P (86.7)$\perp$to the c axis, (60.2) $\parallel$ to the c axis, (77.9) P (81.6)$\perp$to the c axis, (56.7) $\parallel$ to the c axis, (73.3) P (75.9)$\perp$to the c axis, (52.7) $\parallel$ to the c axis, 68.2 P (74.2)$\perp$to the c axis, (51.5) $\parallel$ to the c axis, 66.6 P 69.3$\perp$to the c axis, 48.1 $\parallel$ to the c axis, 62.2 P 66.4$\perp$to the c axis, 46.1 $\parallel$ to the c axis, 59.6 P List The Soviet Union; 68.2	1; 2; 3; 4 5 6; 7; 8; 9 10 11; 12; 13; 14 15 16; 18; 20; 25 30 35; 40; 45; 50 70; 90; 100; 150 200 273.2; 300; 400; 500 273.15		*The P Conductivity is the conductivity of polycrystalline Tin. TPRC Tin is well annealed 99.999+% pure white tin with residual electrical resistivity ρ_{0}=0.000120, 0.0001272 & 0.000133 μΩ cm respectively for the single crystal along directions perpendicular $\perp$ and parallel $\parallel$ to the c axis and for polycrystalline tin P. The recommended values are thought to be accurate to within 3% near room temperature and 3 to [unintelligible] at other temperatures. Values in parentheses are extrapolated, interpolated, or estimated. *It happens that the online record has the thermal conductivity at 30 Kelvins and $\parallel$ to the c axis posted at 1.36 W⋅cm^{−1} K^{−1} and 78.0 Btu hr^{−1} ft^{−1} F^{−1} which is incorrect. Also the copy is blurred up enough to give you the impression that maybe what it really means is 1.36 W^{−1} cm^{−1} K^{−1} and 78.6 Btu hr^{−1} ft^{−1} F^{−1} and a type-head that got overdue for its cleaning since the secretary had a tall heap of papers on her desk and if that is the case then the multilingual expression is perfectly consistent. TPRC Data Series Volume 1, page 408. This material is superconductive (electrical) at temperatures below 3.722 Kelvins. Weast page E-75.
Titanium, pure	15.6-19.0-21.9-22.5	293-300	1,852,000 - 2,381,000	
Titanium alloy	5.8	296	595,200	(Ti+6%Al+4%V)
Tungsten, pure	173 1440; 9710; 208; 173; 118; 98	1; 10; 100; 293; 1000; 2000	18,940,000	
Wallboard (1929)	0.0640; 0.0581; 0.0633; List	322.8		Stiles, H., Chem. Met. Eng.,36, 625–6, 1929, TPRC Volume 2 pages 1131 and 1172. This is commercial wallboard in three samples of it at the same mean temperature.
Water	0.563-0.596-0.6-0.609 Deionized ultra-filtered water 0.598 TPRC; 0.5225*; 0.5551*; 0.5818; 0.5918; 0.6084; 0.6233; 0.6367; 0.6485; 0.6587; 0.6673; 0.6797; 0.6864; 0.6727; 0.6348; 0.5708; List The Soviet Union; 0.599	273-293-300 293.15 250; 270; 280; 290; 300; 310; 320; 330; 340; 350; 370; 400; 450; 500; 550 293.15	5×Pure10^{−6}-Sweet10^{−3±1}-Sea1	<4%(NaCl+MgCl_{2}+CaCl_{2}) *The TPRC Estimates for water at 250K and 270K are for supercooled liquid. Of course the values for 400K and above are for water under steam pressure.
Water vapor	0.016-0.02479 (101.3 kPa); 0.0471 (1 bar)	293-398; 600		
Wood, moist	+>=12% water: 0.09091-0.16-0.21-0.4; The Royal Society: Fir L Specific gravity=0.6 15% moisture ⊥ to the grain U*: 0.117; Mahogany L Specific gravity=0.70 15% m & ⊥ to the grain R*: 0.167; 15% m & ⊥ to the grain T*: 0.155; 15% m & $\parallel$ to the grain: 0.310; Oak L Specific gravity=0.60 14% m & ⊥ to the grain T: 0.117; Spruce: L Electric Oven; 3.40% m & ⊥ to the grain R: 0.122; 5.80% m & ⊥ to the grain R: 0.126; 7.70% m & ⊥ to the grain R: 0.129; 9.95% m & ⊥ to the grain R: 0.133; 17.0% m & ⊥ to the grain R: 0.142; Specific gravity=0.041 16% m & ⊥ to the grain R: 0.121; 16% m & ⊥ to the grain T: 0.105; 16% m & $\parallel$ to the grain: 0.222; Teak L Specific gravity=0.72 10% m & ⊥ to the grain T: 0.138; Walnut L Specific gravity=0.65 12.1% m & ⊥ to the grain R: 0.145; 11.3% m & ⊥ to the grain T: 0.136; 11.8% m & $\parallel$ to the grain: 0.332; List	298-293 293.2 293.2; 293.2; 293.2 293.2 373.2; 373.2; 373.2; 373.2; 373.2 293.2; 293.2; 293.2 293.2 293.2; 293.2; 293.2		Species-Variable The Royal Society: Griffiths, E. and Kaye, G. W. C., Proc. Roy. Soc. (London), A104, 71–98, 1923, TPRC Volume 2, pages 1073, 1080, 1082, 1086 and 1162. *The R conductivity is the thermal conductivity radial to the annual rings, T is tangential to those rings and U is unspecified. Mahogany: page 1080, Oak: page 1082, Spruce: page 1086, Teak: page 1087, Walnut: page 1089. Method: Longitudinal Heat Flow, TPRC 1, page 24a. Note: all the percentages refer to moisture. The Fir was measured at 15%, Mahogany, 15%, Oak, 14%, Spruce, 3.40%, 5.80%, 7.70%, 9.95%, 17.0% and 16%. Teak was measured at 10% and Walnut was measured at 12.1%, 11.3% and 11.8% moisture.
Wood, unspecified	0.04-0.055-0.07692-0.12-0.17 The Royal Society; Walnut L ⊥ to the grain & tangent to the annual rings, various pressures and thicknesses all 0.137 ± 0.001 twelve times over. Griffiths, E. and Kaye, G. W. C., Proc. Roy. Soc. (London), A104, 71–98, 1923 in TPRC 2 page 1089. Various; Pine, see Pine. Redwood Bark, see Redwood Bark.	293-298 293.2		Balsa-Cedar-Hickory/Oak
Wool, Angora wool	0.0464	293.2		Bettini, T. M., Ric. Sci. 20 (4), 464–6, 1950, TPRC pages 1092 and 1172
Wool felt	0.0623; 0.0732	313.2; 343.2		Taylor, T. S., Mech. Eng., 42, 8–10, 1920, TPRC pages 1133 and 1161.
Zinc, pure	116	293	16,950,000	
Zinc oxide	21			
Zirconium dioxide	Slip Cast, first run (1950); 2.03; 1.98; 1.96; 1.91; 1.91; 1.90; Second Run (1950); 1.81; 1.80; 1.92; 1.90; 1.95; 1.92; 1.97; 1.98; 2.04; 2.29; CaO stabilized (1964); 1.54; 1.64; 1.64; 1.76; 1.62; 1.79; 1.80; 2.46; 2.33; 2.80; 2.56; 2.70; List	766.2; 899.2; 1006.2; 1090.2; 1171.2; 1233.2 386.2; 470.2; 553.2; 632.2; 734.2; 839.2; 961.2; 1076.2; 1163.2; 1203.2 1343.2; 1513.2; 1593.2; 1663.2; 1743.2; 2003.2; 2103.2; 2323.2; 2413.2; 2413.2; 2493.2; 2523.2		First Run: Density=5.35 g cm^{−3}. Norton, F. H., Kingery, W. D., Fellows, D. M., Adams, M., McQuarrie, M. C. and Coble, R. L. USAEC Rept. NYO-596, 1–9, 1950, TPRC pages 247 and 1160 Second Run: Same Specimen, same USAEC Report. CaO stabilized: Density=4.046 g cm^{−3} (66.3% of theoretical). Feith, A. D., Gen. Elec. Co., Adv. Tech. Service, USAEC Rept. GEMP-296, 1-25, 1964, TPRC pages 247 and 1165. Some recent developments include Zirconia fibrous thermal insulation for temperatures up to about 2000 Kelvins. Various conductivities less than 0.4 w m^{−1} K^{−1}. Zircar Zirconia, Inc.
Material	Thermal conductivity [W·m^{−1}·K^{−1}]	Temperature [K]	Electrical conductivity @ 293 K [Ω^{−1}·m^{−1}]	Notes

== See also ==
- Laser flash analysis
- List of insulation materials
- R-value (insulation)
- Thermal transmittance
- Specific heat capacity
- Thermal conductivity
- Thermal conductivities of the elements (data page)
- Thermal diffusivity
- Thermodynamics

== Bibliography ==
- David R. Lide, ed. (2003). CRC Handbook of Chemistry and Physics (84th ed.). Boca Raton, FL: CRC Press. ISBN 978-0-8493-0484-2.
