= Charles Herbert Lees =

British physicist

- Born: 28 July 1864; Oldham, Lancashire
- Died: 25 September 1952 (aged 88); Tonbridge, Kent
- Known for: Lee's Disc Method
- Spouse: Evelyn May Savidge
- Awards: Royal Society Bakerian Medal 1908
- Scientific career
- Fields: Thermal conductivity
- Workplaces: University of Manchester Queen Mary College, London

Charles Herbert Lees FRS (28 July 1864 - 25 September 1952) was a British physicist known for his work measuring thermal conductivity.

== Early life and education ==
Lees was born on 28 July 1864 in Oldham, Lancashire, to John Lees and his wife Jane, née Ogden. His father was an engineer who was notable for discovering the "Leg of Mutton" gold nugget in Australia in 1853, that was presented to Queen Victoria. The house in which Lees was born was named Ballarat, after the location where the gold was found.

Lees was sent to Highfield Academy in 1870, where he became head boy. He passed the Junior Cambridge Local Examination with honours in 1879, and began work with the Gas Superintendent of Oldham, while also taking evening classes at the Oldham School of Science and Art.

In May 1882, Lees sat the exams of the Science and Art Department of the Privy Council and attained a Platt Local Exhibition, allowing him to attend Owens College, now the University of Manchester. Here, he studied maths under Horace Lamb and electromagnetism under Arthur Schuster, and also conducted practical research on electrolysis.

In 1887, Lees traveled to Strasbourg to study physics under August Kundt and maths under Elwin Christoffel, where he began work on investigating thermal conductivity.

== Scientific career ==
Lees received a Bishop Berkeley Fellowship at Manchester in 1888, and began lecturing on thermodynamics. This continued until 1891, when he moved to the Central Technical College, where he worked under William Ayrton.

Lees returned to Owens College to become a Senior Assistant Lecturer and Demonstrator in Physics, and attained a DSc in 1895. He became a full lecturer in 1900, becoming at the same time the Assistant Director of the Physical Laboratories.

He became Secretary of Section A of the British Association in 1898 and oversaw the logistics of the International Magnetic Conference for Sir Arthur Rücker. He was Recorder of Section A from 1901 to 1905, from 1901 to 1906 was Honorary Secretary of the Literary and Philosophical Society of Manchester and from 1902 to 1906 was both Secretary of the Faculty of Science at Manchester and a governor of Mottram Grammar School, along with being the University of Manchester's representative the Education Committee of Blackburn.

Lees moved to East London College, now Queen Mary, in March 1906, and was elected a fellow of the Royal Society on 3 May 1906. In 1908, Lees was awarded the Bakerian Medal for his work on the thermal conductivity of metals at low temperatures.

In 1912, the University of London appointed him a full professor, and from 1917 to 1930 he was Vice-Principal of what was by now Queen Mary College, of which he was elected a Fellow in 1934.

From 1918 to 1920, he was President of the Physical Society of London, and he was later vice-president of the Institute of Physics. He also spent 20 years as a member of the Engineering Committee of the Food Investigation Board at the Department of Scientific and Industrial Research. Lees retired in 1930, becoming an emeritus professor.

== Thermal conductivity ==
Lee's measurement technique, known as Lee's Disc Method, built on earlier work by Anders Ångström, who would take a bar of the material being measured and vary the temperature of one end periodically, then measure the temperatures of other points on the bar, expressed as a Fourier expansion.

In Lee's method, a disc of the material being measured is used instead, held between two brass plates, one of which is heated using a steam chamber. Each plate contains a thermometer, and the thermal conductivity of the disc between them can be given as H=kA(T_{2}-T_{1})/x, in which H is the rate of heat transfer, k is the disc's thermal conductivity, A is the cross-sectional area of the disc, x is the thickness of the disc T_{1} and T_{2} are the starting temperatures of the two brass plates.

== Personal life ==
Lees married Evelyn May Savidge on 3 July 1902, and they had three sons and two daughters.

From 1911 to 1917 he was deacon of Woodford Green Congregational Church, and in 1919 he became deacon and vice-chairman of Tonbridge Congregational Church, being appointed Life Elder in 1944.

Lees died on 25 September 1952 at Greenacres in Tonbridge, Kent.
