= THW (disambiguation) =

The THW is the Technisches Hilfswerk, a German federal agency for emergency management.

THW or Thw may also refer to:

== Science and technology ==
- George Henry Kendrick Thwaites (1812-1882), English botanist and entomologist (botanical abbreviation: Thw.)
- Transient hot wire method, to measure thermal conductivity
- Trinity High Water, a defunct vertical datum on the River Thames, London

== Transport ==
- The Hawthorns station, a rail and tram station near Birmingham, England (GBR code: THW)
- Trincomalee Harbour Waterdrome, Sri Lanka (IATA code: THW)

== Other uses ==
- The Hillbilly Way, an American country music band
- THW Kiel, a German handball team
