= Thermal conductivities of the elements =

Chemical data page

This page lists the thermal conductivity of the common stable isotope for each of the elements.

== Thermal conductivity ==
Element			Usable value	Source data			
No.	Sym.	Name	Usable value	(Note: Values refer to 27 °C unless noted.)	(Note: Values refer to 300 K and a pressure of 100 kPa (1 bar), or to the saturation vapor pressure if that is less than 100 kPa. The notation (p=0) denotes low pressure limiting values.)	(Note: Values refer to 300 K.)	(Note: Values refer to 25 °C.)
1	H	Hydrogen	180.5 mW/(m·K)		186.9 mW/(m·K) (at p=0)	0.1805 W/(m·K)	0.1805 W/(m·K)
2	He	Helium	151.3 mW/(m·K)		156.7 mW/(m·K) (at p=0)	0.1513 W/(m·K)	0.1513 W/(m·K)
3	Li	Lithium	84.8 W/(m·K)	0.847 W/(cm·K)		84.8 W/(m·K)	85 W/(m·K)
4	Be	Beryllium	200 W/(m·K)	2.00 W/(cm·K)		200 W/(m·K)	190 W/(m·K)
5	B	Boron	27.4 W/(m·K)			27.4 W/(m·K)	27 W/(m·K)
6	C	Carbon	(diamond) (900–2320) W/(m·K) (graphite) (119–165) W/(m·K)	(diamond) (type I) 8.95 W/(cm·K) (type IIa) 23.0 W/(cm·K) (type IIb) 13.5 W/(cm·K) (pyrolytic graphite) (parallel to the layer planes) 19.5 W/(cm·K) (perpendicular) 0.0570 W/(cm·K)		(diamond) (900–2320) W/(m·K) (graphite) (119–165) W/(m·K) (amorphous) 1.59 W/(m·K)	(graphite) 140 W/(m·K)
7	N	Nitrogen	25.83 mW/(m·K)		26.0 mW/(m·K)	0.02583 W/(m·K)	0.02583 W/(m·K)
8	O	Oxygen	26.58 mW/(m·K)		26.3 mW/(m·K)	(gas) 0.02658 W/(m·K) (liquid) 0.149 W/(m·K)	0.02658 W/(m·K)
9	F	Fluorine	27.7 mW/(m·K)			0.0277 W/(m·K)	0.0277 W/(m·K)
10	Ne	Neon	49.1 mW/(m·K)		49.8 mW/(m·K) (at p=0)	0.0491 W/(m·K)	0.0491 W/(m·K)
11	Na	Sodium	142 W/(m·K)	1.41 W/(cm·K)		142 W/(m·K)	140 W/(m·K)
12	Mg	Magnesium	156 W/(m·K)	1.56 W/(cm·K)		156 W/(m·K)	160 W/(m·K)
13	Al	Aluminium	237 W/(m·K)	2.37 W/(cm·K)		237 W/(m·K)	235 W/(m·K)
14	Si	Silicon	149 W/(m·K)			149 W/(m·K)	150 W/(m·K)
15	P	Phosphorus	(white) 0.236 W/(m·K)			(white) 0.23617 W/(m·K) [sic]	0.236 W/(m·K)
16	S	Sulfur	(amorphous) 0.205 W/(m·K)			(amorphous) 0.205 W/(m·K)	0.205 W/(m·K)
17	Cl	Chlorine	8.9 mW/(m·K)			0.0089 W/(m·K)	0.0089 W/(m·K)
18	Ar	Argon	17.72 mW/(m·K)		17.9 mW/(m·K)	0.01772 W/(m·K)	0.01772 W/(m·K)
19	K	Potassium	102.5 W/(m·K)	1.024 W/(cm·K)		102.5 W/(m·K)	100 W/(m·K)
20	Ca	Calcium	201 W/(m·K)	2.00 W/(cm·K)		201 W/(m·K)	200 W/(m·K)
21	Sc	Scandium	15.8 W/(m·K)	0.158 W/(cm·K)		15.8 W/(m·K)	16 W/(m·K)
22	Ti	Titanium	21.9 W/(m·K)	0.219 W/(cm·K)		21.9 W/(m·K)	22 W/(m·K)
23	V	Vanadium	30.7 W/(m·K)	0.307 W/(cm·K)		30.7 W/(m·K)	31 W/(m·K)
24	Cr	Chromium	93.9 W/(m·K)	0.937 W/(cm·K)		93.9 W/(m·K)	94 W/(m·K)
25	Mn	Manganese	7.81 W/(m·K)	0.0782 W/(cm·K)		7.81 W/(m·K)	7.8 W/(m·K)
26	Fe	Iron	80.4 W/(m·K)	0.802 W/(cm·K)		80.4 W/(m·K)	80 W/(m·K)
27	Co	Cobalt	100 W/(m·K)	1.00 W/(cm·K)		100 W/(m·K)	100 W/(m·K)
28	Ni	Nickel	90.9 W/(m·K)	0.907 W/(cm·K)		90.9 W/(m·K)	91 W/(m·K)
29	Cu	Copper	401 W/(m·K)	4.01 W/(cm·K)		401 W/(m·K)	400 W/(m·K)
30	Zn	Zinc	116 W/(m·K)	1.16 W/(cm·K)		116 W/(m·K)	120 W/(m·K)
31	Ga	Gallium	40.6 W/(m·K)	0.406 W/(cm·K)		(liquid) 29.4 W/(m·K) (solid) 40.6 W/(m·K)	29 W/(m·K)
32	Ge	Germanium	60.2 W/(m·K)			60.2 W/(m·K)	60 W/(m·K)
33	As	Arsenic	50.2 W/(m·K)			50.2 W/(m·K)	50 W/(m·K)
34	Se	Selenium	(amorphous) 0.519 W/(m·K)			(amorphous) 0.519 W/(m·K)	0.52 W/(m·K)
35	Br	Bromine	0.122 W/(m·K)			0.122 W/(m·K)	0.12 W/(m·K)
36	Kr	Krypton	9.43 mW/(m·K)		9.5 mW/(m·K) (at p=0)	9.43 W/(m·K) [sic]	0.00943 W/(m·K)
37	Rb	Rubidium	58.2 W/(m·K)	0.582 W/(cm·K)		58.2 W/(m·K)	58 W/(m·K)
38	Sr	Strontium	35.4 W/(m·K)	0.353 W/(cm·K)		35.4 W/(m·K)	35 W/(m·K)
39	Y	Yttrium	17.2 W/(m·K)	0.172 W/(cm·K)		17.2 W/(m·K)	17 W/(m·K)
40	Zr	Zirconium	22.6 W/(m·K)	0.227 W/(cm·K)		22.6 W/(m·K)	23 W/(m·K)
41	Nb	Niobium	53.7 W/(m·K)	0.537 W/(cm·K)		53.7 W/(m·K)	54 W/(m·K)
42	Mo	Molybdenum	138 W/(m·K)	1.38 W/(cm·K)		138 W/(m·K)	139 W/(m·K)
43	Tc	Technetium	50.6 W/(m·K)	0.506 W/(cm·K)		50.6 W/(m·K)	51 W/(m·K)
44	Ru	Ruthenium	117 W/(m·K)	1.17 W/(cm·K)		117 W/(m·K)	120 W/(m·K)
45	Rh	Rhodium	150 W/(m·K)	1.50 W/(cm·K)		150 W/(m·K)	150 W/(m·K)
46	Pd	Palladium	71.8 W/(m·K)	0.718 W/(cm·K)		71.8 W/(m·K)	72 W/(m·K)
47	Ag	Silver	429 W/(m·K)	4.29 W/(cm·K)		429 W/(m·K)	430 W/(m·K)
48	Cd	Cadmium	96.6 W/(m·K)	0.968 W/(cm·K)		96.6 W/(m·K)	97 W/(m·K)
49	In	Indium	81.8 W/(m·K)	0.816 W/(cm·K)		81.8 W/(m·K)	82 W/(m·K)
50	Sn	Tin	66.8 W/(m·K)	0.666 W/(cm·K)		66.8 W/(m·K)	67 W/(m·K)
51	Sb	Antimony	24.4 W/(m·K)	0.243 W/(cm·K)		24.4 W/(m·K)	24 W/(m·K)
52	Te	Tellurium	(1.97–3.38) W/(m·K)			(1.97–3.38) W/(m·K)	3 W/(m·K)
53	I	Iodine	0.449 W/(m·K)	0.45 W/(m·K) (at 300 K)		449 W/(m·K) [sic]	0.449 W/(m·K)
54	Xe	Xenon	5.65 mW/(m·K)		5.5 mW/(m·K) (at p=0)	0.00565 W/(m·K)	0.00565 W/(m·K)
55	Cs	Caesium	35.9 W/(m·K)	0.359 W/(cm·K)		35.9 W/(m·K)	36 W/(m·K)
56	Ba	Barium	18.4 W/(m·K)	0.184 W/(cm·K)		18.4 W/(m·K)	18 W/(m·K)
57	La	Lanthanum	13.4 W/(m·K)	0.134 W/(cm·K)		13.4 W/(m·K)	13 W/(m·K)
58	Ce	Cerium	11.3 W/(m·K)	0.113 W/(cm·K)		11.3 W/(m·K)	11 W/(m·K)
59	Pr	Praseodymium	12.5 W/(m·K)	0.125 W/(cm·K)		12.5 W/(m·K)	13 W/(m·K)
60	Nd	Neodymium	16.5 W/(m·K)	0.165 W/(cm·K)		16.5 W/(m·K)	17 W/(m·K)
61	Pm	Promethium	17.9 W/(m·K)	0.15 W/(cm·K) (est.)		17.9 W/(m·K)	15 W/(m·K)
62	Sm	Samarium	13.3 W/(m·K)	0.133 W/(cm·K)		13.3 W/(m·K)	13 W/(m·K)
63	Eu	Europium	13.9 W/(m·K) (est.)	0.139 W/(cm·K) (est.)		13.9 W/(m·K)	14 W/(m·K)
64	Gd	Gadolinium	10.6 W/(m·K)	0.105 W/(cm·K) (at 100 °C)		10.5 W/(m·K)	11 W/(m·K)
65	Tb	Terbium	11.1 W/(m·K)	0.111 W/(cm·K)		11.1 W/(m·K)	11 W/(m·K)
66	Dy	Dysprosium	10.7 W/(m·K)	0.107 W/(cm·K)		10.7 W/(m·K)	11 W/(m·K)
67	Ho	Holmium	16.2 W/(m·K)	0.162 W/(cm·K)		16.2 W/(m·K)	16 W/(m·K)
68	Er	Erbium	14.5 W/(m·K)	0.145 W/(cm·K)		14.5 W/(m·K)	15 W/(m·K)
69	Tm	Thulium	16.9 W/(m·K)	0.169 W/(cm·K)		16.9 W/(m·K)	17 W/(m·K)
70	Yb	Ytterbium	38.5 W/(m·K)	0.385 W/(cm·K)		38.5 W/(m·K)	39 W/(m·K)
71	Lu	Lutetium	16.4 W/(m·K)	0.164 W/(cm·K)		16.4 W/(m·K)	16 W/(m·K)
72	Hf	Hafnium	23.0 W/(m·K)	0.230 W/(cm·K)		23.0 W/(m·K)	23 W/(m·K)
73	Ta	Tantalum	57.5 W/(m·K)	0.575 W/(cm·K)		57.5 W/(m·K)	57 W/(m·K)
74	W	Tungsten	173 W/(m·K)	1.74 W/(cm·K)		173 W/(m·K)	170 W/(m·K)
75	Re	Rhenium	48.0 W/(m·K)	0.479 W/(cm·K)		48.0 W/(m·K)	48 W/(m·K)
76	Os	Osmium	87.6 W/(m·K)	0.876 W/(cm·K)		87.6 W/(m·K)	88 W/(m·K)
77	Ir	Iridium	147 W/(m·K)	1.47 W/(cm·K)		147 W/(m·K)	150 W/(m·K)
78	Pt	Platinum	71.6 W/(m·K)	0.716 W/(cm·K)		71.6 W/(m·K)	72 W/(m·K)
79	Au	Gold	318 W/(m·K)	3.17 W/(cm·K)		318 W/(m·K)	320 W/(m·K)
80	Hg	Mercury	8.30 W/(m·K)	0.0834 W/(cm·K)		8.30 W/(m·K)	8.3 W/(m·K)
81	T	Thallium	46.1 W/(m·K)	0.461 W/(cm·K)		46.1 W/(m·K)	46 W/(m·K)
82	Pb	Lead	35.3 W/(m·K)	0.353 W/(cm·K)		35.3 W/(m·K)	35 W/(m·K)
83	Bi	Bismuth	7.97 W/(m·K)	0.0787 W/(cm·K)		7.97 W/(m·K)	8 W/(m·K)
84	Po	Polonium		0.20 W/(cm·K)		0.2 W/(m·K)	
85	At	Astatine	1.7 W/(m·K)			1.7 W/(m·K)	2 W/(m·K)
86	Rn	Radon	3.61 mW/(m·K)			0.00361 W/(m·K)	0.00361 W/(m·K)
88	Ra	Radium	18.6 W/(m·K)			18.6 W/(m·K)	19 W/(m·K)
89	Ac	Actinium	12 W/(m·K)			12 W/(m·K)	12 W/(m·K)
90	Th	Thorium	54.0 W/(m·K)	0.540 W/(cm·K)		54.0 W/(m·K)	54 W/(m·K)
91	Pa	Protactinium	47 W/(m·K)			47 W/(m·K)	47 W/(m·K)
92	U	Uranium	27.5 W/(m·K)	0.276 W/(cm·K)		27.5 W/(m·K)	27 W/(m·K)
93	Np	Neptunium	6.3 W/(m·K)	0.063 W/(cm·K)		6.3 W/(m·K)	6 W/(m·K)
94	Pu	Plutonium	6.74 W/(m·K)	0.0674 W/(cm·K)		6.74 W/(m·K)	6 W/(m·K)
95	Am	Americium	10 W/(m·K)			10 W/(m·K)	10 W/(m·K)
97	Bk	Berkelium	10 W/(m·K)			10 W/(m·K)	10 W/(m·K)

== See also ==
- List of thermal conductivities
