= Thermal conductivity measurement =

Measurement of capacity of a material to conduct heat

There are a number of possible ways to measure thermal conductivity, each of them suitable for a limited range of materials, depending on the thermal properties and the medium temperature. Three classes of methods exist to measure the thermal conductivity of a sample: steady-state, time-domain, and frequency-domain methods.

== Steady-state methods ==
In general, steady-state techniques perform a measurement when the temperature of the material measured does not change with time. This makes the signal analysis straightforward (steady state implies constant signals). The disadvantage is that a well-engineered experimental setup is usually needed.

Steady-state methods, in general, work by applying a known heat flux, $\dot Q (W/m^2)$, to a sample with a surface area, $A(m^2)$, and thickness, $x (m)$; once the sample's steady-state temperature is reached, the difference in temperature, $\Delta T$, across the thickness of the sample is measured. After assuming one-dimensional heat flow and an isotropic medium, Fourier's law is then used to calculate the measured thermal conductivity, $k$:

$$\dot Q=-k \frac{\Delta T}{x}$$

Major sources of error in steady-state measurements include radiative and convective heat losses in the setup, as well as errors in the thickness of the sample propagating to the thermal conductivity.

In geology and geophysics, the most common method for consolidated rock samples is the divided bar. There are various modifications to these devices depending on the temperatures and pressures needed as well as sample sizes. A sample of unknown conductivity is placed between two samples of known conductivity (usually brass plates). The setup is usually vertical with the hot brass plate at the top, the sample in between then the cold brass plate at the bottom. Heat is supplied at the top and made to move downwards to stop any convection within the sample. Measurements are taken after the sample has reached to the steady state (with zero heat gradient or constant heat over entire sample), this usually takes about 30 minutes and over.

=== Other steady-state methods ===
For good conductors of heat, Searle's bar method can be used. For poor conductors of heat, Lee's disc method can be used.

== Time-domain methods ==
The transient techniques perform a measurement during the process of heating up. The advantage is that measurements can be made relatively quickly. Transient methods are usually carried out by needle probes.

Non-steady-state methods to measure the thermal conductivity do not require the signal to obtain a constant value. Instead, the signal is studied as a function of time. The advantage of these methods is that they can in general be performed more quickly, since there is no need to wait for a steady-state situation. The disadvantage is that the mathematical analysis of the data is generally more difficult.

=== Transient hot wire method ===
The transient hot wire method (THW) is a very popular, accurate and precise technique to measure the thermal conductivity of gases, liquids, solids, nanofluids and refrigerants in a wide temperature and pressure range. The technique is based on recording the transient temperature rise of a thin vertical metal wire with infinite length when a step voltage is applied to it. The wire is immersed in a fluid and can act both as an electrical heating element and a resistance thermometer. The transient hot wire method has advantage over the other thermal conductivity method since there is a fully developed theory and there is no calibration or single-point calibration. Furthermore, because of the very small measuring time (1 s) there is no convection present in the measurements and only the thermal conductivity of the fluid is measured with very high accuracy.

Most of the THW sensors used in academia consist of two identical very thin wires with only difference in the length. Sensors using a single wire, are used both in academia and industry with the advantage over the two-wire sensors the ease of handling of the sensor and change of the wire.

An ASTM standard is published for the measurements of engine coolants using a single-transient hot wire method.

=== Transient plane source method ===
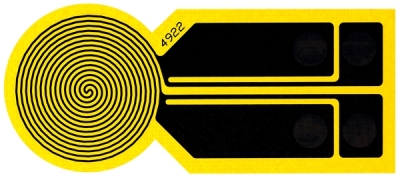
TPS sensor, model Hot Disk 4922, spiral radius about 15 mm

Transient Plane Source Method, utilizing a plane sensor and a special mathematical model describing the heat conductivity, combined with electronics, enables the method to be used to measure Thermal Transport Properties. It covers a thermal conductivity range of at least 0.01-500 W/m/K (in accordance with ISO 22007-2) and can be used for measuring various kinds of materials, such as solids, liquid, paste and thin films etc. In 2008 it was approved as an ISO-standard for measuring thermal transport properties of polymers (November 2008). This TPS standard also covers the use of this method to test both isotropic and anisotropic materials.

The Transient Plane Source technique typically employs two samples halves, in-between which the sensor is sandwiched. Normally the samples should be homogeneous, but extended use of transient plane source testing of heterogeneous material is possible, with proper selection of sensor size to maximize sample penetration. This method can also be used in a single-sided configuration, with the introduction of a known insulation material used as sensor support.

The flat sensor consists of a continuous double spiral of electrically conducting nickel (Ni) metal, etched out of a thin foil. The nickel spiral is situated between two layers of thin polyimide film Kapton. The thin Kapton films provides electrical insulation and mechanical stability to the sensor. The sensor is placed between two halves of the sample to be measured. During the measurement a constant electrical effect passes through the conducting spiral, increasing the sensor temperature. The heat generated dissipates into the sample on both sides of the sensor, at a rate depending on the thermal transport properties of the material. By recording temperature vs. time response in the sensor, the thermal conductivity, thermal diffusivity and specific heat capacity of the material can be calculated. For highly conducting materials, very large samples are needed (some litres of volume).

=== Modified transient plane source (MTPS) method ===
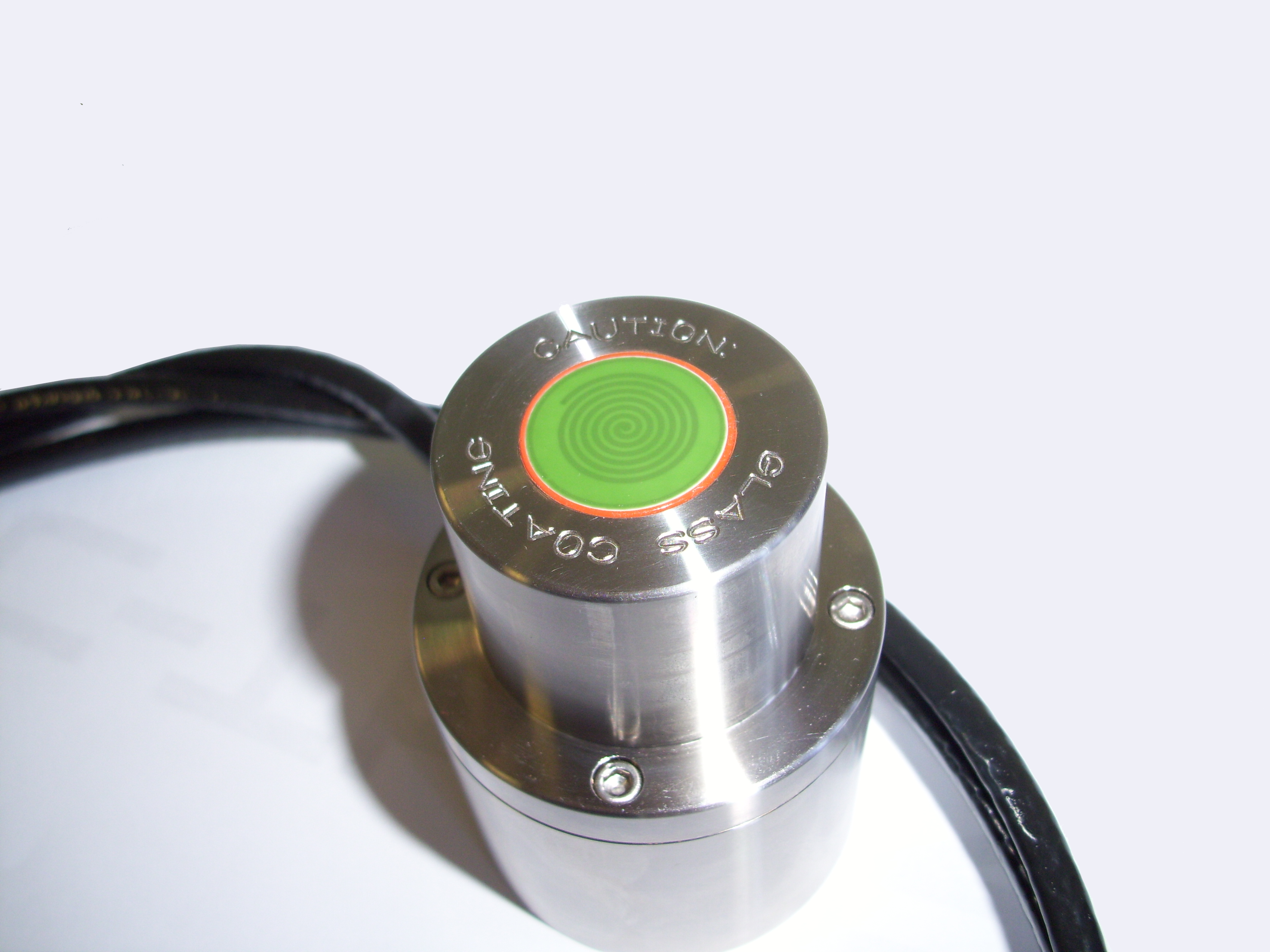
Modified Transient Plane Source Sensor.

A variation of the above method is the Modified Transient Plane Source Method (MTPS) developed by Nancy Mathis. The device uses a one-sided, interfacial, heat reflectance sensor that applies a momentary, constant heat source to the sample.

The main modification made to the traditional Transient Plane Source technique described above is the construction of the sensor; the heating element is supported on a backing, which provides mechanical support, electrical insulation and thermal insulation, as opposed to the Kapton-encapsulated nickel wire structure that the Transient Plane Source sensors employ. This modification provides a one-sided interfacial measurement without any modifications to the sensor-sample assembly.

=== Transient line source method ===
Series of needle probes used for transient line source measurements. Photo shows, from left to right, models TP02, TP08, a ballpoint for purposes of size comparison, TP03 and TP09

The physical model behind this method is the infinite line source with constant power per unit length. The temperature profile $T(t,r)$ at a distance $r$ at time $t$ is as follows

$$T(t,r) = \frac{Q}{4 \pi k} \mathrm{Ei} \left( \frac{r^2}{4 a t} \right)$$

where

$Q$ is the power per unit length, in [W·m^{−1}]
$k$ is the thermal conductivity of the sample, in [W·m^{−1}·K^{−1}]
$\mathrm{Ei}(x)$ is the exponential integral, a transcendent mathematical function
$r$ is the radial distance to the line source
$a$ is the thermal diffusivity, in [m^{2}·s^{−1}]
$t$ is the amount of time that has passed since heating has started, in [s]

When performing an experiment, one measures the temperature at a point at fixed distance, and follows that temperature in time. For large times, the exponential integral can be approximated by making use of the following relation

$$\mathrm{Ei}(x) = - \gamma - \ln (x) + O(x^2)$$

where

$\gamma \approx 0.577$ is the Euler–Mascheroni constant

This leads to the following expression

$$T(t,r) = \frac{Q}{4 \pi k} \left\{ -\gamma -\ln \left( \frac{r^2}{4 a} \right) + \ln (t) \right\}$$

Note that the first two terms in the brackets on the RHS are constants. Thus if the probe temperature is plotted versus the natural logarithm of time, the thermal conductivity can be determined from the slope given knowledge of Q. Typically this means ignoring the first 60 to 120 seconds of data and measuring for 600 to 1200 seconds. Typically, this method is used for gases and liquids whose thermal conductivities are between 0.1 and 50 W/(mK). If the thermal conductivities are too high, the diagram often does not show a linearity, so that no evaluation is possible.

=== Modified transient line source method ===
A variation on the Transient Line Source method is used for measuring the thermal conductivity of a large mass of the earth for Geothermal Heat Pump (GHP/GSHP) system design. This is generally called Ground Thermal Response Testing (TRT) by the GHP industry. Understanding the ground conductivity and thermal capacity is essential to proper GHP design, and using TRT to measure these properties was first presented in 1983 (Mogensen). The now commonly used procedure, introduced by Eklöf and Gehlin in 1996 and now approved by ASHRAE involves inserting a pipe loop deep into the ground (in a well bore, filling the anulus of the bore with a grout substance of known thermal properties, heating the fluid in the pipe loop, and measuring the temperature drop in the loop from the inlet and return pipes in the bore. The ground thermal conductivity is estimated using the line source approximation method—plotting a straight line on the log of the thermal response measured. A very stable thermal source and pumping circuit are required for this procedure.

More advanced Ground TRT methods are currently under development. The DOE is now validating a new Advanced Thermal Conductivity test said to require half the time as the existing approach, while also eliminating the requirement for a stable thermal source. This new technique is based on multi-dimensional model-based TRT data analysis.

=== Laser flash method ===
The laser flash method is used to measure thermal diffusivity of a thin disc in the thickness direction. This method is based upon the measurement of the temperature rise at the rear face of the thin-disc specimen produced by a short energy pulse on the front face. With a reference sample specific heat can be achieved and with known density the thermal conductivity results as follows

$$k(T) = a(T) \cdot c_P(T) \cdot \rho(T)$$

where

$k$ is the thermal conductivity of the sample, in [W·m^{−1}·K^{−1}]
$a$ is the thermal diffusivity of the sample, in [m^{2} ·s^{−1}]
$c_P$ is the specific heat capacity of the sample, in [J·kg^{−1}·K^{−1}]
$\rho$ is the density of the sample, in [kg·m^{−3}]

It is suitable for a multiplicity of different materials over a broad temperature range (−120 °C to 2800 °C).

=== Time-domain thermoreflectance method ===
Time-domain thermoreflectance is a method by which the thermal properties of a material can be measured, most importantly thermal conductivity. This method can be applied most notably to thin film materials, which have properties that vary greatly when compared to the same materials in bulk. The idea behind this technique is that once a material is heated up, the change in the reflectance of the surface can be utilized to derive the thermal properties. The change in reflectivity is measured with respect to time, and the data received can be matched to a model which contain coefficients that correspond to thermal properties.

== Frequency-domain methods ==
=== 3ω-method ===
One popular technique for electro-thermal characterization of materials is the 3ω-method, in which a thin metal structure (generally a wire or a film) is deposited on the sample to function as a resistive heater and a resistance temperature detector (RTD). The heater is driven with AC current at frequency ω, which induces periodic joule heating at frequency 2ω due to the oscillation of the AC signal during a single period. There will be some delay between the heating of the sample and the temperature response which is dependent upon the thermal properties of the sensor/sample. This temperature response is measured by logging the amplitude and phase delay of the AC voltage signal from the heater across a range of frequencies (generally accomplished using a lock-in-amplifier). Note, the phase delay of the signal is the lag between the heating signal and the temperature response. The measured voltage will contain both the fundamental and third harmonic components (ω and 3ω respectively), because the Joule heating of the metal structure induces oscillations in its resistance with frequency 2ω due to the temperature coefficient of resistance (TCR) of the metal heater/sensor as stated in the following equation:

$$V=IR=I_0e^{i\omega t}\left (R_0+\frac{\partial R}{\partial T}\Delta T \right )=I_0e^{i\omega t}\left (R_0+C_0e^{i2\omega t} \right )$$,

where C_{0} is constant. Thermal conductivity is determined by the linear slope of ΔT vs. log(ω) curve. The main advantages of the 3ω-method are minimization of radiation effects and easier acquisition of the temperature dependence of the thermal conductivity than in the steady-state techniques. Although some expertise in thin film patterning and microlithography is required, this technique is considered as the best pseudo-contact method available. (ch23)

=== Frequency-domain hot-wire method ===
The transient hot wire method can be combined with the 3ω-method to accurately measure the thermal conductivity of solid and molten compounds from room temperature up to 800 °C. In high temperature liquids, errors from convection and radiation make steady-state and time-domain thermal conductivity measurements vary widely; this is evident in the previous measurements for molten nitrates. By operating in the frequency-domain, the thermal conductivity of the liquid can be measured using a 25 μm diameter hot-wire while rejecting the influence of ambient temperature fluctuations, minimizing error from radiation, and minimizing errors from convection by keeping the probed volume below 1 μL.

=== Freestanding sensor-based 3ω-method ===
The freestanding sensor-based 3ω technique is proposed and developed as a candidate for the conventional 3ω method for thermophysical properties measurement. The method covers the determination of solids, powders and fluids from cryogenic temperatures to around 400 K. For solid samples, the method is applicable to both bulks and tens of micrometers thick wafers/membranes, dense or porous surfaces. The thermal conductivity and thermal effusivity can be measured using selected sensors, respectively. Two basic forms are now available: the linear source freestanding sensor and the planar source freestanding sensor. The range of thermophysical properties can be covered by different forms of the technique, with the exception that the recommended thermal conductivity range where the highest precision can be attained is 0.01 to 150 W/m•K for the linear source freestanding sensor and 500 to 8000 J/m2•K•s0.5 for the planar source freestanding sensor.

== Measuring devices ==
A thermal conductance tester, one of the instruments of gemology, determines if gems are genuine diamonds using diamond's uniquely high thermal conductivity.

For an example, see Measuring Instrument of Heat Conductivity of ITP-MG4 "Zond" (Russia).

== Standards ==
- EN 12667, "Thermal performance of building materials and products. Determination of thermal resistance by means of guarded hot plate and heat flow meter methods. Products of high and medium thermal resistance", ISBN 0-580-36512-3.
- ISO 8301, "Thermal insulation – Determination of steady-state thermal resistance and related properties – Heat flow meter apparatus"
- ISO 8497, "Thermal insulation – Determination of steady-state thermal transmission properties of thermal insulation for circular pipes", ISBN 0-580-26907-8
- ISO 22007-2:2008 "Plastics – Determination of thermal conductivity and thermal diffusivity – Part 2: Transient plane heat source (hot disc) method"
- ISO 22007-4:2008 "Plastics – Determination of thermal conductivity and thermal diffusivity – Part 4: Laser flash method"
- IEEE Standard 442–1981, "IEEE guide for soil thermal resistivity measurements", ISBN 0-7381-0794-8. See also soil thermal properties.
- IEEE Standard 98-2002, "Standard for the Preparation of Test Procedures for the Thermal Evaluation of Solid Electrical Insulating Materials", ISBN 0-7381-3277-2
- ASTM Standard C518 – 10, "Standard Test Method for Steady-State Thermal Transmission Properties by Means of the Heat Flow Meter Apparatus"
- ASTM Standard D5334-14, "Standard Test Method for Determination of Thermal Conductivity of Soil and Soft Rock by Thermal Needle Probe Procedure"
- ASTM Standard D5470-06, "Standard Test Method for Thermal Transmission Properties of Thermally Conductive Electrical Insulation Materials"
- ASTM Standard E1225-04, "Standard Test Method for Thermal Conductivity of Solids by Means of the Guarded-Comparative-Longitudinal Heat Flow Technique"
- ASTM Standard D5930-01, "Standard Test Method for Thermal Conductivity of Plastics by Means of a Transient Line-Source Technique"
- ASTM Standard D2717-95, "Standard Test Method for Thermal Conductivity of Liquids"
- ASTM Standard E1461-13(2022), "Standard Test Method for Thermal Diffusivity by the Flash Method."
