= Laser flash analysis =

Method of measuring thermal diffusivity of a material

Laser Flash Apparatus
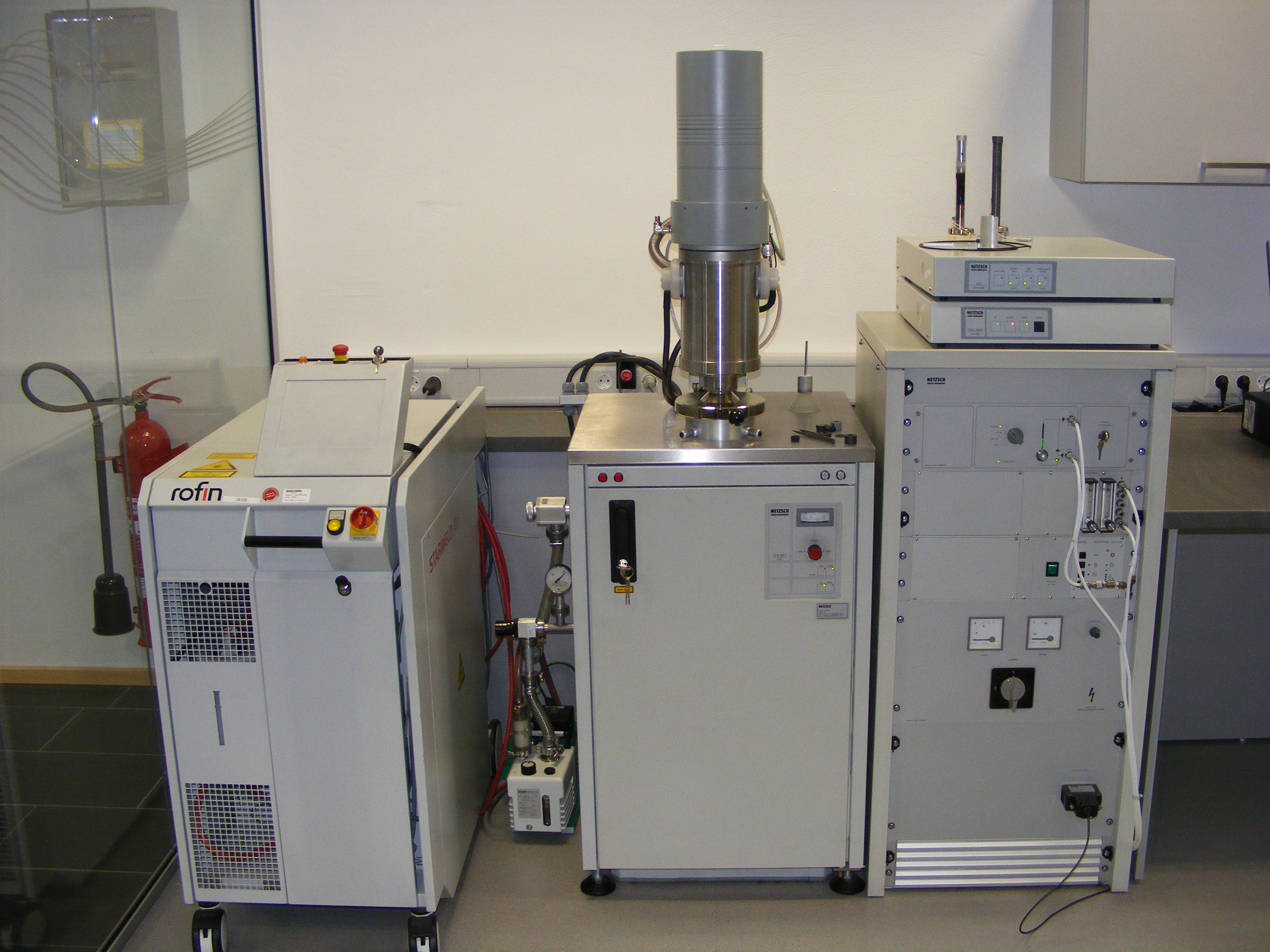

The laser flash analysis or laser flash method is used to measure thermal diffusivity of a variety of different materials. An energy pulse heats one side of a plane-parallel sample and the resulting time dependent temperature rise on the backside due to the energy input is detected. The higher the thermal diffusivity of the sample, the faster the energy reaches the backside. A laser flash apparatus (LFA) to measure thermal diffusivity over a broad temperature range, is shown on the right hand side.

In a one-dimensional, adiabatic case the thermal diffusivity $a$ is calculated from this temperature rise as follows:

$$a = 0.1388 \cdot \frac{d^2}{t_{1/2}}$$

Where

- $a$ is the thermal diffusivity in cm^{2}/s
- $d$ is the thickness of the sample in cm
- $t_{1/2}$ is the time to the half maximum in s

As the coefficient 0.1388 is dimensionless, the formula works also for $a$ and $d$ in their corresponding SI units.

== Measurement principle ==
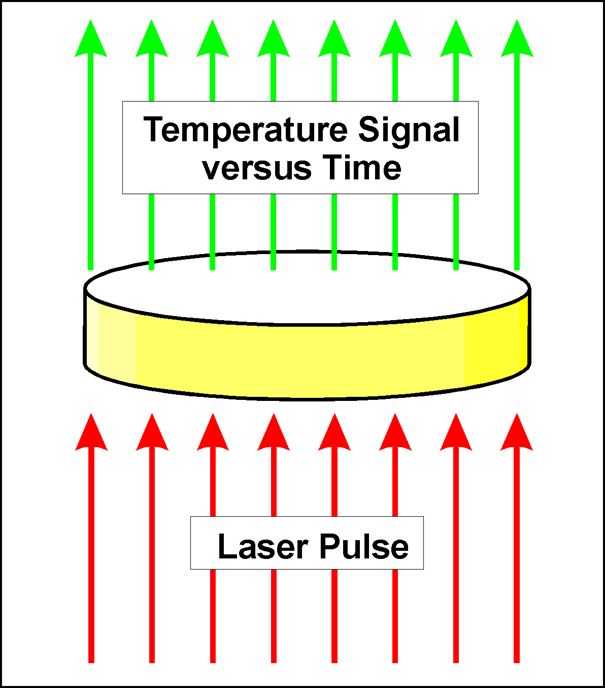
LFA measurement principle: An energy / laser pulse (red) heats the sample (yellow) on the bottom side and a detector detects the temperature signal versus time on the top side (green).

The laser flash method was developed by Parker et al. in 1961. In a vertical setup, a light source (e.g. laser, flashlamp) heats the sample from the bottom side and a detector on top detects the time-dependent temperature rise. For measuring the thermal diffusivity, which is strongly temperature-dependent, at different temperatures the sample can be placed in a furnace at constant temperature.

Perfect conditions are

- homogeneous material,
- a homogeneous energy input on the front side
- a time-dependent short pulse – in form of a Dirac delta function

Several improvements on the models have been made. In 1963 Cowan takes radiation and convection on the surface into account. Cape and Lehman consider transient heat transfer, finite pulse effects and also heat losses in the same year. Blumm and Opfermann improved the Cape-Lehman-Model with high order solutions of radial transient heat transfer and facial heat loss, non-linear regression routine in case of high heat losses and an advanced, patented pulse length correction.

== See also ==
- Thermal conductivity
- Thermal conductivity measurement
- Thermal diffusivity
- Thermal physics
