= Transient hot wire method =

Technique for measuring thermal conductivity

The transient hot wire method (THW) is a technique for measuring the thermal conductivity of gases, liquids, solids, nanofluids and refrigerants in a wide temperature and pressure range. The technique is based on recording the transient temperature rise of a thin vertical metal wire with infinite length when a step voltage is applied to it. The wire is immersed in a fluid and can act both as an electrical heating element and a resistance thermometer. The transient hot wire method has advantage over the other thermal conductivity methods, since there is a fully developed theory and there is no calibration or single-point calibration. Furthermore, because of the very small measuring time (1 s) there is no convection present in the measurements and only the thermal conductivity of the fluid is measured with very high accuracy.

Most transient hot wire sensors used in academia consist of two very thin wires that differ in length but are otherwise identical. Sensors using a single wire are used both in academia and industry with the advantage over the two-wire sensors in the ease of handling of the sensor and change of the wire.

An ASTM standard has been published for the measurement of engine coolants using a single-transient hot wire method.

== History ==
200 years ago scientists were using a crude version of this method to make the first ever thermal conductivity measurements on gases.

- 1781 - Joseph Priestley attempts to measure the ability of different gases to conduct heat using the heated wire experiment.
- 1931 - Sven Pyk and Bertil Stalhane proposed the first “transient” hot wire method for the measurement of thermal conductivity of solids and powders. Unlike previous methods, the one devised by Pyk and Stalhane used shorter measurement times due to the transient nature of the measurement.
- 1971 - Davis et al. proposed introduced a modified design with thinner and shorter wires, enabling measuring times between 1 and 10 seconds using a digital voltmeter. J. W. Haarman who introduced the electronic Wheatstone bridge that is a common feature of other modern transient methods.
- 1976 - Healy et al. published a journal article detailing the theory of the transient hot wire, described by an ideal solution with appropriate corrections to address effects like convection, among others.
