= Mechanically aided scrubber =

Form of pollution control technology

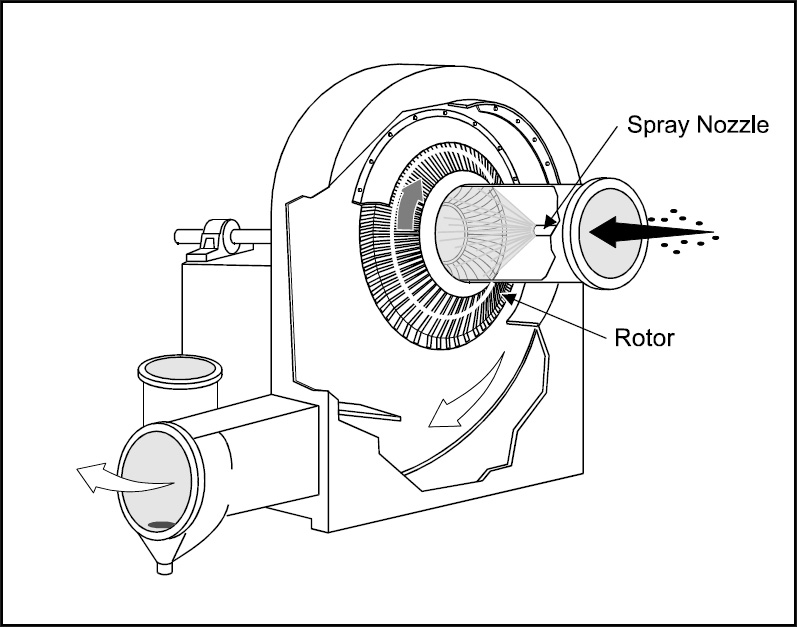
Figure 1 -Centrifugal fan scrubber

Mechanically aided scrubbers are a form of pollution control technology. This type of technology is a part of the group of air pollution controls collectively referred to as wet scrubbers.

In addition to using liquid sprays or the exhaust stream, scrubbing systems can use motors to supply energy. The motor drives a rotor or paddles which, in turn, generate water droplets for gas and particle collection.

Systems designed in this manner have the advantage of requiring less space than other scrubbers, but their overall power requirements tend to be higher than other scrubbers of equivalent efficiency. Significant power losses occur in driving the rotor. Therefore, not all the power used is expended for gas–liquid contact.

== Types ==
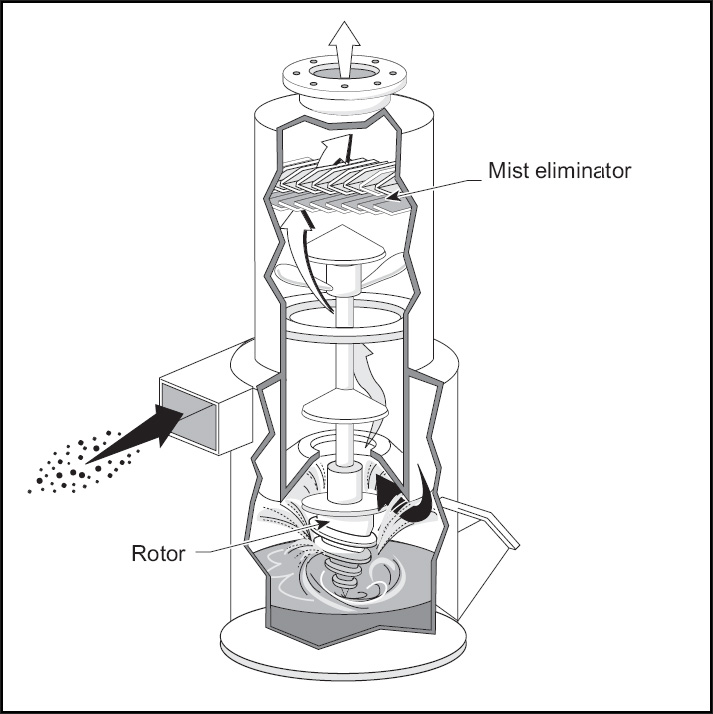
Figure 2 - Induced spray scrubber

There are fewer mechanically aided scrubber designs available than liquid- and gas-phase contacting collector designs. Two are more common: centrifugal fan scrubbers and mechanically induced spray scrubbers.

A centrifugal-fan scrubber can serve as both an air mover and a collection device. Figure 1 shows such a system, where water is sprayed onto the fan blades concurrently with the moving exhaust gas. Some gaseous pollutants and particles are initially removed as they pass over the liquid sprays.
The liquid droplets then impact on the blades to create smaller droplets for additional collection targets. Collection can also take place on the liquid film that forms on the fan blades. The rotating blades force the liquid and collected particles off the blades. The liquid droplets separate from the gas stream because of their centrifugal motion.

Centrifugal-fan collectors are the most compact of the wet scrubbers since the fan and collector comprise a combined unit. No internal pressure loss occurs across the scrubber, but a power loss equivalent to a pressure drop of 10.2 to 15.2 cm (4 to 6 in) of water occurs because the blower efficiency is low.

Another mechanically aided scrubber, the induced-spray, consists of a whirling rotor submerged in a pool of liquid. The whirling rotor produces a fine droplet spray. By moving the process gas through the spray, particles and gaseous pollutants can subsequently be collected.

Figure 2 shows an induced-spray scrubber that uses a vertical-spray rotor.

== Particle collection ==
Mechanically aided scrubbers are capable of high collection efficiencies for particles with diameters of 1 μm or greater. Achieving these usually requires a greater energy input than those of other scrubbers operating at similar efficiencies. In mechanically aided scrubbers, the majority of particle collection occurs in the liquid droplets formed by the rotating blades or rotor.

== Gas collection ==
Mechanically aided scrubbers are generally not used for gas absorption. The contact time between the gas and liquid phases is very short, limiting absorption. For gas removal, several other scrubbing systems provide much better removal per unit of energy consumed.

== Maintenance problems ==
As with almost any device, the addition of moving parts leads to an increase in potential maintenance problems. Mechanically aided scrubbers have higher maintenance costs than other wet collector systems. The moving parts are particularly susceptible to corrosion and fouling. In addition, rotating parts are subject to vibration-induced fatigue or wear, causing them to become unbalanced. Corrosion-resistant materials for these scrubbers are very expensive; therefore, these devices are not used in applications where corrosion or sticky materials could cause problems.

== Summary ==
Mechanically aided scrubbers have been used to control exhaust streams containing particulate matter. They have the advantage of being smaller than most other scrubbing systems, since the fan is incorporated into the scrubber. In addition, they operate with low liquid-to-gas ratios. Their disadvantages include their generally high maintenance requirements, low absorption efficiency, and high operating costs.
The performance characteristics of mechanically aided scrubbers are given in Table 1.

Table 1. Operating characteristics of mechanically aided scrubbers
Pollutant	Pressure drop (Δp)	Liquid-to-gas ratio (L/G)	Liquid-inlet pressure (p_{L})	Particle diameter	Applications
Particles	10-20 cm of water (4.0-8.0 in of water)	0.07-0.2 L/m^{3} (centrifugal); 0.5-1.5 gal/1,000 ft^{3} (centrifugal)	20-60 psig (centrifugal)	1 μm	Mining operations Food product industries Chemical industry Foundries and steel mills
Particles	10-20 cm of water (4.0-8.0 in of water)	0.5-0.7 L/m^{3} (spray rotor); 4-5 gal/1,000 ft^{3} (spray rotor)	20-60 psig (centrifugal)	1 μm	Mining operations Food product industries Chemical industry Foundries and steel mills

Note: These devices are used mainly for particle collection, though can also remove gaseous pollutants from the exhaust stream.

== Bibliography ==
- Bethea, R. M. 1978. Air Pollution Control Technology. New York: Van Nostrand Reinhold.
- McIlvaine Company. 1974. The Wet Scrubber Handbook. Northbrook, IL: McIlvaine Company.
- Richards, J. R. 1995. Control of Particulate Emissions (APTI Course 413). U.S. Environmental Protection Agency.
- Richards, J. R. 1995. Control of Gaseous Emissions. (APTI Course 415). U.S. Environmental Protection Agency.
- U.S. Environmental Protection Agency. 1969. Control Techniques for Particulate Air Pollutants. AP-51.
