= Cyclonic spray scrubber =

Pollution-control technology

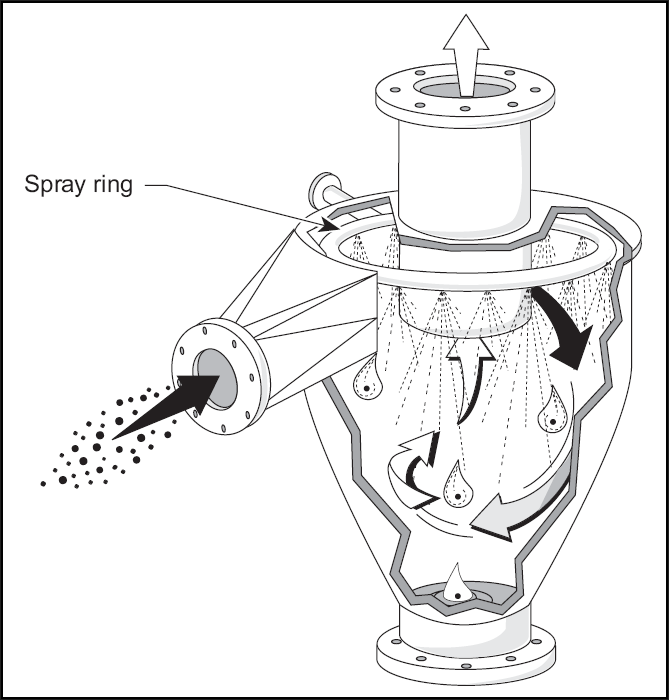
Figure 1 – Irrigated cyclone scrubber

Cyclonic spray scrubbers are an air-pollution-control technology. They use the features of both the dry cyclone and the spray chamber to remove pollutants from gas streams.

Generally, the inlet gas enters the chamber tangentially, swirls through the chamber in a corkscrew motion, and exits. At the same time, liquid is sprayed inside the chamber. As the gas swirls around the chamber, pollutants are removed when they impact on liquid droplets, are thrown to the walls, and washed back down and out.

Cyclonic scrubbers are generally low- to medium-energy devices, with pressure drops of 4 to 25 cm (1.6 to 9.8 in) of water. Commercially available designs include the irrigated cyclone scrubber and the cyclonic spray scrubber.

In the irrigated cyclone (Figure 1), the inlet gas enters near the top of the scrubber into the water sprays. The gas is forced to swirl downward, then change directions, and return upward in a tighter spiral. The liquid droplets produced capture the pollutants, are eventually thrown to the side walls, and carried out of the collector. The "cleaned" gas leaves through the top of the chamber.

The cyclonic spray scrubber (Figure 2) forces the inlet gas up through the chamber from a bottom tangential entry. Liquid sprayed from nozzles on a center post (manifold) is directed toward the chamber walls and through the swirling gas. As in the irrigated cyclone, liquid captures the pollutant, is forced to the walls, and washes out. The "cleaned" gas continues upward, exiting through the straightening vanes at the top of the chamber.

This type of technology is a part of the group of air pollution controls collectively referred to as wet scrubbers.

== Particulate collection ==
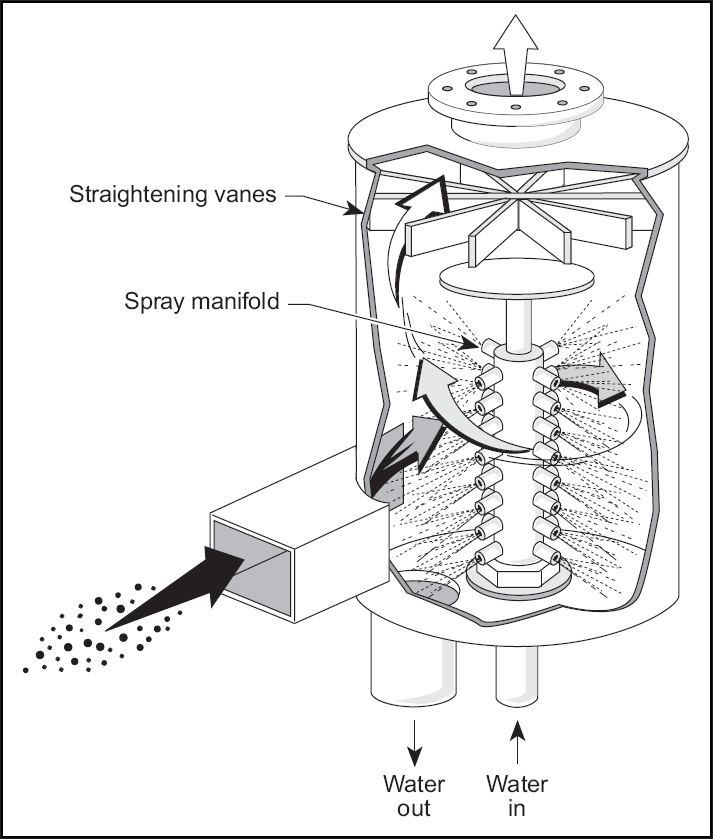
Figure 2 – Cyclonic spray scrubber

Cyclonic spray scrubbers are more efficient than spray towers, but not as efficient as venturi scrubbers, in removing particulate from the inlet gas stream. Particulates larger than 5 μm are generally collected by impaction with 90% efficiency. In a simple spray tower, the velocity of the particulates in the gas stream is low: 0.6 to 1.5 metres per second (2.0 to 4.9 ft/s).

By introducing the inlet gas tangentially into the spray chamber, the cyclonic scrubber increases gas velocities (thus, particulate velocities) to approximately 60 to 180 metres per second (200 to 590 ft/s). The velocity of the liquid spray is approximately the same in both devices. This higher particulate-to-liquid relative velocity increases particulate collection efficiency for this device over that of the spray chamber. Gas velocities of 60 to 180 m/s are equivalent to those encountered in a Venturi scrubber; however, cyclonic spray scrubbers are not as efficient as Venturi scrubbers because they are not capable of producing the same degree of useful turbulence.

== Gas collection ==
High gas velocities through these devices reduce the gas-liquid contact time, thus reducing absorption efficiency. Cyclonic spray scrubbers are capable of effectively removing some gases; however, they are rarely chosen when gaseous pollutant removal is the only concern.

== Maintenance problems ==
The main maintenance problems with cyclonic scrubbers are nozzle plugging and corrosion or erosion of the side walls of the cyclone body. Nozzles have a tendency to plug from particulates. The best solution is to install the nozzles so that they are easily accessible for cleaning or removal.

Due to high gas velocities, erosion of the side walls of the cyclone can also be a problem. Abrasion-resistant materials may be used to protect the cyclone body, especially at the inlet.

== Summary ==
The pressure drops across cyclonic scrubbers are usually 4 to 25 cm (1.6 to 9.8 in) of water; therefore, they are low- to medium-energy devices and are most often used to control large-sized particulates. Relatively simple devices, they resist plugging because of their open construction. They also have the additional advantage of acting as entrainment separators because of their shape. The liquid droplets are forced to the sides of the cyclone and removed prior to exiting the vessel. Their biggest disadvantages are that they are not capable of removing submicrometer particulates and they do not efficiently absorb most pollutant gases.

Table 1 lists typical operating characteristics of cyclonic scrubbers.

Table 1. Operating characteristics of spray towers
Pollutant	Pressure drop (Δp)	Liquid-to-gas ratio (L/G)	Liquid-inlet pressure (p_{L})	Removal efficiency	Applications
Gases	4–25 cm of water (1.5-10 in of water)	0.3-1.3 L/m^{3} (2-10 gal/1,000 ft^{3})	280–2,800 kPa (40-400 psig)	Only effective for very soluble gases	Mining operations Drying operations Food processing Foundries
Particulates	4–25 cm of water (1.5-10 in of water)	0.3-1.3 L/m^{3} (2-10 gal/1,000 ft^{3})	280–2,800 kPa (40-400 psig)	2-3 μm diameter	Mining operations Drying operations Food processing Foundries

== Bibliography ==
- Bethea, R. M. 1978. Air Pollution Control Technology. New York: Van Nostrand Reinhold.
- McIlvaine Company. 1974. The Wet Scrubber Handbook. Northbrook, IL: McIlvaine Company.
- Richards, J. R. 1995. Control of Particulate Emissions (APTI Course 413). U.S. Environmental Protection Agency.
- Richards, J. R. 1995. Control of Gaseous Emissions. (APTI Course 415). U.S. Environmental Protection Agency.
- U.S. Environmental Protection Agency. 1969. Control Techniques for Particulate Air Pollutants. AP-51.
