= Scrubber =

Group of air pollution control devices

A scrubber is a air pollution control device used to remove some particulates and/or gases from industrial wastewater and exhaust gas. Types of scrubbers include chemical scrubbers and gas scrubbers.

An early application of a carbon dioxide scrubber was in the submarine the Ictíneo I, in 1859; a role for which they continue to be used today. Traditionally, the term "scrubber" has referred to pollution control devices that use liquid to wash unwanted pollutants from a gas stream. Recently, the term has also been used to describe systems that inject a dry reagent or slurry into a dirty exhaust stream to "wash out" acid gases. Scrubbers are one of the primary devices that control gaseous emissions, especially acid gases. Scrubbers can also be used for heat recovery from hot gases by flue-gas condensation. They are also used for the high flows in solar, PV, or LED processes.

There are several methods to remove toxic or corrosive compounds from exhaust gas and neutralize it.

== Combustion ==
Combustion is sometimes the cause of harmful exhausts, but, in many cases, combustion may also be used for exhaust gas cleaning if the temperature is high enough and enough oxygen is available.

== Wet scrubbing ==
The exhaust gases of combustion may contain substances considered harmful to the environment, and the scrubber may remove or neutralize those. A wet scrubber is used for the cleaning air, fuel gas or other gases of various pollutants and dust particles. Wet scrubbing works via the contact of target compounds or particulate matter with the scrubbing solution. Water is the most common solvent used to remove inorganic contaminants, particularly for dust, but solutions of reagents that specifically target certain compounds may also be used.

Process exhaust gas can also contain water-soluble toxic and/or corrosive gases like hydrochloric acid (HCl) or ammonia (NH_{3}). These can be removed very well by a wet scrubber.

Removal efficiency of pollutants is improved by increasing residence time in the scrubber or by the increase of surface area of the scrubber solution by the use of a spray nozzle, packed towers or an aspirator. Wet scrubbers may increase the proportion of water in the gas, resulting in a visible stack plume, if the gas is sent to a stack.

Wet scrubbers can also be used for heat recovery from hot gases by flue-gas condensation. In this mode, termed a condensing scrubber, water from the scrubber drain is circulated through a cooler to the nozzles at the top of the scrubber. The hot gas enters the scrubber at the bottom. If the gas temperature is above the water dew point, it is initially cooled by evaporation of water drops. Further cooling causes water vapors to condense, adding to the amount of circulating water.

The condensation of water releases significant amounts of low temperature heat due to the high value of the specific latent heat of the vaporisation of water (more than 2 gigajoules (560 kWh) per ton of water), which can be recovered by the cooler for e.g. district heating purposes.

Excess condensed water must continuously be removed from the circulating water.

== Dry scrubbing ==
A dry or semi-dry scrubbing system, unlike the wet scrubber, does not saturate the flue gas stream that is being treated with moisture. In some cases no moisture is added, while in others only the amount of moisture that can be evaporated in the flue gas without condensing is added. Therefore, dry scrubbers generally do not have a stack steam plume or wastewater handling/disposal requirements. Dry scrubbing systems are used to remove acid gases (such as SO_{2} and HCl) primarily from combustion sources.

There are a number of dry type scrubbing system designs. However, all consist of two main sections or devices: a device to introduce the acid gas sorbent material into the gas stream and a particulate matter control device to remove reaction products, excess sorbent material as well as any particulate matter already in the flue gas.

Dry scrubbing systems can be categorized as dry sorbent injectors (DSIs) or as spray dryer absorbers (SDAs). Spray dryer absorbers are also called semi-dry scrubbers or spray dryers.

Dry scrubbing systems are often used for the removal of odorous and corrosive gases from wastewater treatment plant operations. The medium used is typically an activated alumina compound impregnated with materials to handle specific gases such as hydrogen sulfide. Media used can be mixed together to offer a wide range of removal for other odorous compounds such as methyl mercaptans, aldehydes, volatile organic compounds, dimethyl sulfide, and dimethyl disulfide.

Dry sorbent injection involves the addition of an alkaline material (usually hydrated lime, soda ash, or sodium bicarbonate) into the gas stream to react with the acid gases. The sorbent can be injected directly into several different locations: the combustion process, the flue gas duct (ahead of the particulate control device), or an open reaction chamber (if one exists). The acid gases react with the alkaline sorbents to form solid salts which are removed in the particulate control device. These simple systems can achieve only limited acid gas (SO_{2} and HCl) removal efficiencies. Higher collection efficiencies can be achieved by increasing the flue gas humidity (i.e., cooling using water spray). These devices have been used on medical waste incinerators and a few municipal waste combustors.

In spray dryer absorbers, the flue gases are introduced into an absorbing tower (dryer) where the gases are contacted with a finely atomized alkaline slurry. Acid gases are absorbed by the slurry mixture and react to form solid salts which are removed by the particulate control device. The heat of the flue gas is used to evaporate all the water droplets, leaving a non-saturated flue gas to exit the absorber tower. Spray dryers are capable of achieving high (80+%) acid gas removal efficiencies. These devices have been used on industrial and utility boilers and municipal waste incinerators.

== Adsorber ==
Many chemicals can be removed from exhaust gas also by using adsorber material. The flue gas is passed through a cartridge which is filled with one or several adsorber materials and has been adapted to the chemical properties of the components to be removed. This type of scrubber is sometimes also called dry scrubber. The adsorber material has to be replaced after its surface is saturated. Note: adsorption is a surface phenomena, absorption involves the entire material. Ex: Activated carbon an adsorbent, used for the adsorption of odorous compounds.

== Mercury removal ==
Mercury is a highly toxic element commonly found in coal and municipal waste. Wet scrubbers are only effective for removal of soluble mercury species, such as oxidized mercury, Hg^{2+}. Mercury vapor in its elemental form, Hg^{0}, is insoluble in the scrubber slurry and not removed. Therefore, an additional process of Hg^{0} conversion is required to complete mercury capture. Usually halogens are added to the flue gas for this purpose. The type of coal burned as well as the presence of a selective catalytic reduction unit both affect the ratio of elemental to oxidized mercury in the flue gas and thus the degree to which the mercury is removed.

In July 2015, one study found that some mercury scrubbers installed on coal power plants inadvertently capture PAH (polycyclic aromatic hydrocarbons) emissions as well.

== Scrubber waste products ==
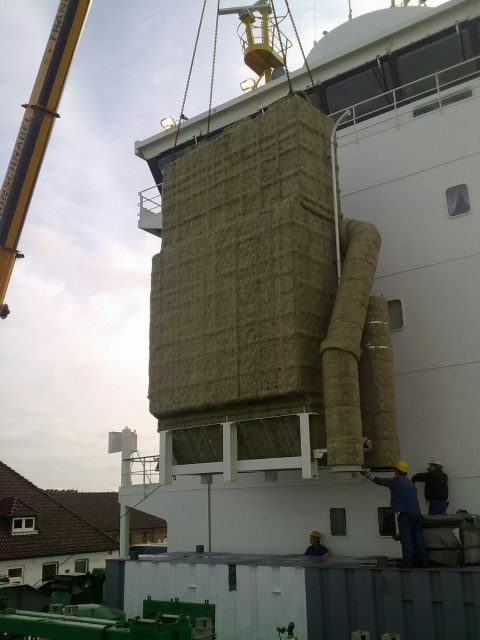
A scrubber during installation at the ship TIMBUS (IMO number: 9198680)

One side effect of scrubbing is that the process only moves the unwanted substance from the exhaust gases into a liquid solution, solid paste or powder form. This must be disposed of safely, if it can not be reused.

For example, mercury removal results in a waste product that either needs further processing to extract the raw mercury, or must be buried in a special hazardous wastes landfill that prevents the mercury from seeping out into the environment. There are issues with that, as it is extremely dangerous to the environment, and many factories cannot process them or have it moved to a landfill.

As an example of reuse, limestone-based scrubbers in coal-fired power plants can produce a synthetic gypsum of sufficient quality that can be used to manufacture drywall and other industrial products.

== Bacteria spread ==
Poorly maintained scrubbers have the potential to spread disease-causing bacteria. The problem is a result of inadequate cleaning. For example, the cause of a 2005 outbreak of Legionnaires' disease in Norway was just a few infected scrubbers. The outbreak caused 10 deaths and more than 50 cases of infection.

== Scrubbers on ships ==
Scrubbers on ships were first used for the production of inert gas for oil tanker operations.

In recent years, many shipping companies have chosen to install scrubbers in their vessels to continue using cheap, sulfur-heavy HFO fuel and still comply with international IMO regulations capping sulfur at 0.5%. The prevalent type, open-loop scrubbers have come under criticism for causing widespread marine ecosystem damage by releasing the used scrubber washwater directly into the sea.

The IMO adopted guidelines on the approval, installation and use of exhaust gas scrubbers (exhaust gas cleaning systems) on board ships to ensure compliance with the sulfur regulation of MARPOL Annex VI. Flag states must approve such systems and port states can (as part of their port state control) ensure that such systems are functioning correctly. If a scrubber system is not functioning properly (and the IMO procedures for such malfunctions are not adhered to), port states can sanction the ship. The United Nations Convention on the Law of the Sea also bestows port states with a right to regulate (and even ban) the use of open loop scrubber systems within ports and internal waters.

== See also ==
- Flue-gas desulfurization
- Flue-gas condensation
- Mercury (element)
- Mercury cycle
- Oil desulfurization
- Electrostatic precipitator
- BS4994 Chemical Process Plant Equipments in FRP
- Catalytic converter
- Wet scrubber
  - Baffle spray scrubber
  - Ejector venturi scrubber
  - Liquid-to-gas ratio
  - Mechanically aided scrubber
  - Spray tower
  - Spray nozzle
  - Stripping (chemistry)
  - Venturi scrubber
