= Baffle spray scrubber =

Air pollution control device

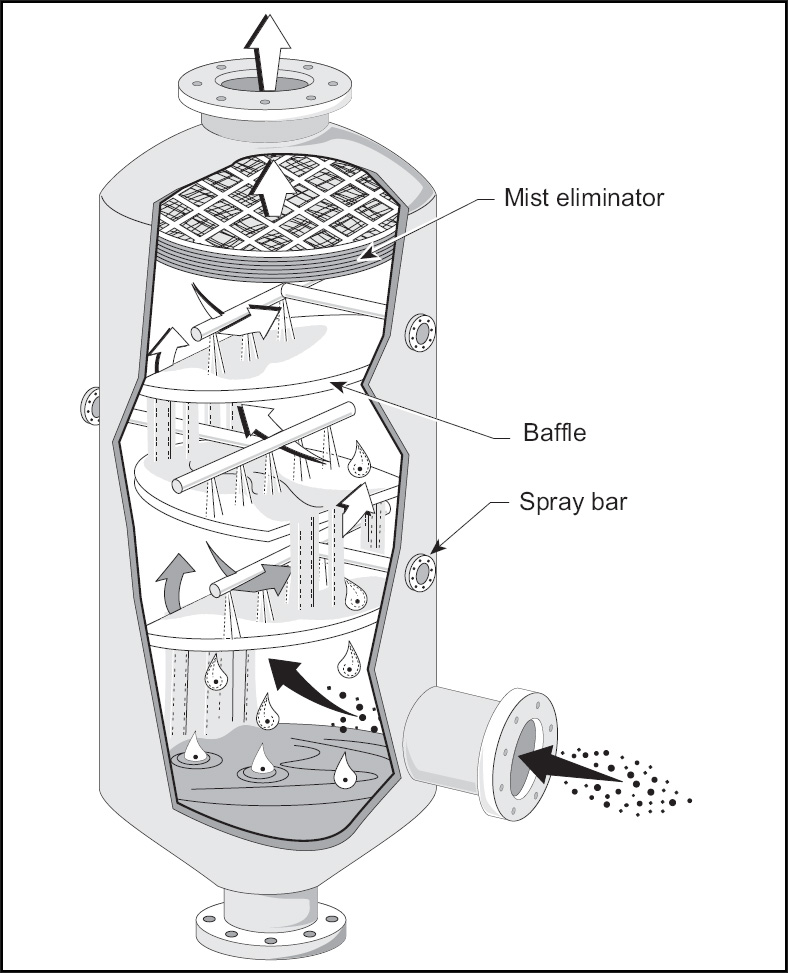
Figure 1 - Baffle spray scrubber

Baffle spray scrubbers are a technology for air pollution control. They are very similar to spray towers in design and operation. However, in addition to using the energy provided by the spray nozzles, baffles are added to allow the gas stream to atomize some liquid as it passes over them.

A simple baffle scrubber system is shown in Figure 1. Liquid sprays capture pollutants and also remove collected particles from the baffles. Adding baffles slightly increases the pressure drop of the system.

This type of technology is a part of the group of air pollution controls collectively referred to as wet scrubbers.

A number of wet-scrubber designs use energy from both the gas stream and liquid stream to collect pollutants. Many of these combination devices are available commercially.

A seemingly unending number of scrubber designs have been developed by changing system geometry and incorporating vanes, nozzles, and baffles.

== Particle collection ==
These devices are used much the same as spray towers - to preclean or remove particles larger than 10 μm in diameter. However, they will tend to plug or corrode if particle concentration of the exhaust gas stream is high.

== Gas collection ==
Even though these devices are not specifically used for gas collection, they are capable of a small amount of gas absorption because of their large wetted surface.

== Summary ==
These devices are most commonly used as precleaners to remove large particles (>10 μm in diameter). The pressure drops across baffle scrubbers are usually low, but so are the collection efficiencies. Maintenance problems are minimal. The main problem is the buildup of solids on the baffles.
Table 1 summarizes the operating characteristics of baffle spray scrubbers.

Table 1. Operating characteristics of baffle spray scrubbers
Pollutant	Pressure drop (Δp)	Liquid-to-gas ratio (L/G)	Liquid-inlet pressure (p_{L})	Removal efficiency	Applications
Gases	2.5-7.5 cm of water	0.13 L/m^{3} (1 gal/1,000 ft^{3})	< 100 kPa (< 15 psig)	very low	Mining operations Incineration; Chemical process industry
Particles	1-3 in of water	0.13 L/m^{3} (1 gal/1,000 ft^{3})	< 100 kPa (< 15 psig)	10 μm diameter	Mining operations Incineration; Chemical process industry

== Bibliography ==
- Bethea, R. M. 1978. Air Pollution Control Technology. New York: Van Nostrand Reinhold.
- McIlvaine Company. 1974. The Wet Scrubber Handbook. Northbrook, IL: McIlvaine Company.
- Richards, J. R. 1995. Control of Particulate Emissions (APTI Course 413). U.S. Environmental Protection Agency.
- Richards, J. R. 1995. Control of Gaseous Emissions. (APTI Course 415). U.S. Environmental Protection Agency.
- U.S. Environmental Protection Agency. 1969. Control Techniques for Particulate Air Pollutants. AP-51.
