= Quench (disambiguation) =

A quench, in materials science, is a rapid cooling.

Quench or quenching may also refer to:

== Science and technology ==
- Quenching (astronomy), a process in which a galaxy loses cold gas ending star formation
- Quenching (fluorescence), any process which decreases the fluorescence intensity of a given substance
- Quenching (scrubber), a type of pollution scrubber
- Magnet quench, a loss of superconductivity resulting in a rapid rise of resistance and temperature, such as in a superconducting magnet
- Dark quencher, a dye that absorbs light, but does not emit it, used in molecular biology
- the means by which a Geiger–Müller tube is able to distinguish individual particles
- in a super-regenerative receiver, the process of interrupting the main RF oscillation with a lower frequency oscillation
- the process of stopping an electrical arc, for example in a fuse or spark-gap transmitter
- in an internal combustion engine, the rapid cooling of fuel inside the combustion chamber that prevents it from burning
- rapid evaporative cooling of a gas by injection of a liquid
- a secondary gas in a neon tube filled with a Penning mixture

== Other uses ==
- Quench (album), by the Beautiful South, 1998
- Quench (band), a British rock band
- Quench (company), an American water-cooler company
- Quench (musician), Australian dance music producer
- Quench, a magazine published by gair rhydd, a student newspaper of Cardiff University
- Quench, a program on the Food Network
- Quench, a Zimbabwean soft drink

== See also ==
- ICMP Source Quench, a message that is part of the internet core protocol
- Lily Quench, a series of children's books
