= Flue-gas condensation =

Process for heat recovery

Flue-gas condensation is the process by which flue gas is cooled to below its water dew point, with the heat released by the resulting condensation of water being recovered as low-temperature heat.

Cooling of the flue gas can be performed with a heat exchanger or via a condensing scrubber.

The condensation of water releases more than 2 gigajoules (560 kWh) per ton of condensed water, which can be recovered in the cooler for district heating purposes.

Excess condensed water must continuously be removed from the process.

The downstream gas is saturated with water, so even though significant amounts of water may have been removed from the cooled gas, it is likely to leave a visible stack plume of water vapor.

If the fuel contains sulfur, the flue gases will contain oxides of sulfur. If the flue gases are cooled below the acid dew point the acid vapor (sulfuric acid, H_{2}SO_{4}) will begin to condense. Acid condensation can result in low-temperature corrosion, which can threaten the safety of the plant. Appropriate corrosion-resistant material selection is important.

The heat-recovery potential is highest for fuels with a high moisture content and where heat is useful at a low temperature. Flue-gas condensation is used at biomass-fired boilers and waste-to-energy plants connected to district heating networks, where recovery is limited by the district-heating return temperature.

== Efficiency exceeding 100% ==
Flue-gas condensation may cause the heat recovered to exceed the lower heating value of the input fuel, and thus an efficiency greater than 100%. The heat of condensation is not included in the lower heating value, which is commonly used in Europe as the basis for fuel energy input. For plants that recover condensate heat, the higher heating value is the more appropriate basis and typically gives efficiencies below 100%.

Should the flue gases be cooled below 25 °C (77 °F), even efficiencies based on the higher heating value may exceed 100%, since typical heating-value definitions assume that all heat is released when combustion products are cooled to somewhere between 15.56 °C (60.01 °F) and 25 °C (77 °F).

== See also ==
- Condensing boiler
- Scrubber
- Wet scrubber
- Heat exchanger
- District heating
