= Flue-gas desulfurization =

Technologies used in fossil-fuel power plants

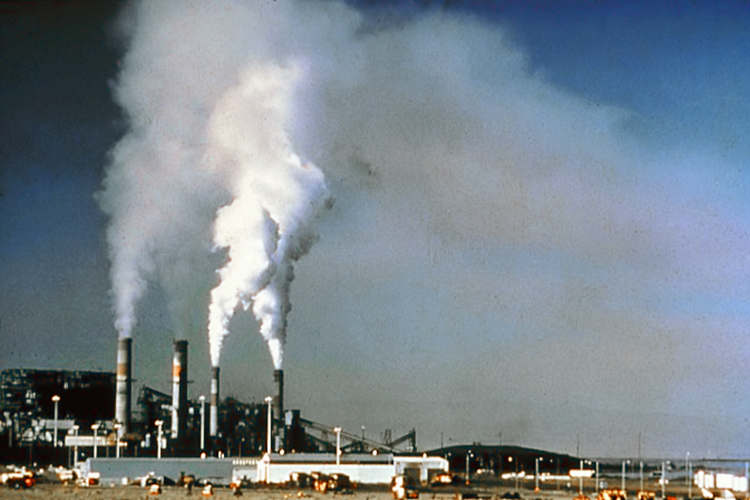
Before flue gas desulfurization was installed, the emissions from the Four Corners Generating Station in New Mexico contained a significant amount of sulfur dioxide.

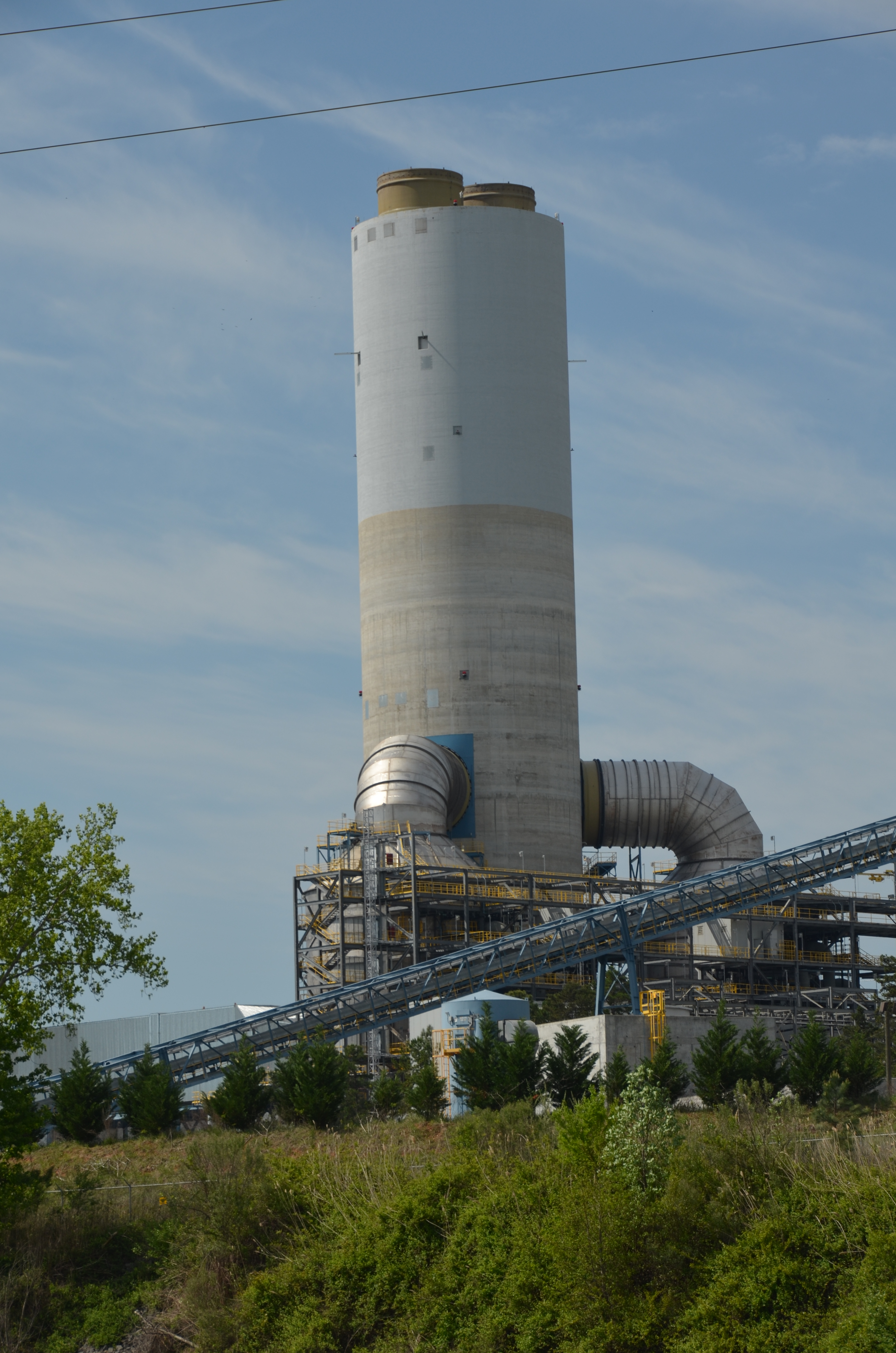
The G. G. Allen Steam Station scrubber (North Carolina)

Flue-gas desulfurization (FGD) is a set of technologies used to remove sulfur dioxide (SO_{2}) from exhaust flue gases of fossil-fuel power plants, and from the emissions of other sulfur oxide emitting processes such as waste incineration, petroleum refineries, cement and lime kilns.

== Methods ==
Since stringent environmental regulations limiting SO_{2} emissions have been enacted in many countries, SO_{2} is being removed from flue gases by a variety of methods. Common methods used:

- Wet scrubbing using a slurry of alkaline sorbent, usually limestone or lime, or seawater to scrub gases;
- Spray-dry scrubbing using similar sorbent slurries;
- Wet sulfuric acid process recovering sulfur in the form of commercial quality sulfuric acid;
- SNOX Flue gas desulfurization removes sulfur dioxide, nitrogen oxides and particulates from flue gases;
- Dry sorbent injection systems that introduce powdered hydrated lime (or other sorbent material) into exhaust ducts to eliminate SO_{2} and SO_{3} from process emissions.

For a typical coal-fired power station, flue-gas desulfurization (FGD) may remove 90 per cent or more of the SO_{2} in the flue gases.

== History ==
Methods of removing sulfur dioxide from boiler and furnace exhaust gases have been studied for over 150 years. Early ideas for flue gas desulfurization were established in England around 1850.

With the construction of large-scale power plants in England in the 1920s, the problems associated with large volumes of SO_{2} from a single site began to concern the public. The SO_{2} emissions problem did not receive much attention until 1929, when the House of Lords upheld the claim of a landowner against the Barton Electricity Works of the Manchester Corporation for damages to his land resulting from SO_{2} emissions. Shortly thereafter, a press campaign was launched against the erection of power plants within the confines of London. This outcry led to the imposition of SO_{2} controls on all such power plants.

The first major FGD unit at a utility was installed in 1931 at Battersea Power Station, owned by London Power Company. In 1935, an FGD system similar to that installed at Battersea went into service at Swansea Power Station. The third major FGD system was installed in 1938 at Fulham Power Station. These three early large-scale FGD installations were suspended during World War II, because the characteristic white vapour plumes would have aided location finding by enemy aircraft. The FGD plant at Battersea was recommissioned after the war and, together with FGD plant at the new Bankside B power station opposite the City of London, operated until the stations closed in 1983 and 1981 respectively. Large-scale FGD units did not reappear at utilities until the 1970s, where most of the installations occurred in the United States and Japan.

The Clean Air Act of 1970 (CAA) and it amendments have influenced implementation of FGD. In 2017, the revised PTC 40 Standard was published. This revised standard (PTC 40-2017) covers Dry and Regenerable FGD systems and provides a more detailed Uncertainty Analysis section. This standard is currently in use today by companies around the world.

As of June 1973, there were 42 FGD units in operation, 36 in Japan and 6 in the United States, ranging in capacity from 5 MW to 250 MW. As of around 1999 and 2000, FGD units were being used in 27 countries, and there were 678 FGD units operating at a total power plant capacity of about 229 gigawatts. About 45% of the FGD capacity was in the U.S., 24% in Germany, 11% in Japan, and 20% in various other countries. Approximately 79% of the units, representing about 199 gigawatts of capacity, were using lime or limestone wet scrubbing. About 18% (or 25 gigawatts) utilized spray-dry scrubbers or sorbent injection systems.

=== FGD on ships ===
The International Maritime Organization (IMO) has adopted guidelines on the approval, installation and use of exhaust gas scrubbers (exhaust gas cleaning systems) on board ships to ensure compliance with the sulphur regulation of MARPOL Annex VI.

The prevalent type on ships are open loop scrubbers which use seawater to spray exhaust gases and then discharge the resulting polluted washwater directly into the ocean. These systems have sparked significant environmental criticism due to their detrimental impact on marine ecosystems.

Flag States must approve such systems and port States can (as part of their port state control) ensure that such systems are functioning correctly. If a scrubber system is not functioning properly (and the IMO procedures for such malfunctions are not adhered to), port States can sanction the ship. The United Nations Convention on the Law Of the Sea also bestows port States with a right to regulate (and even ban) the use of open loop scrubber systems within ports and internal waters.

== Sulfuric acid mist formation ==
Fossil fuels such as coal and oil can contain a significant amount of sulfur. When fossil fuels are burned, about 95 percent or more of the sulfur is generally converted to sulfur dioxide (SO_{2}). Such conversion happens under normal conditions of temperature and of oxygen present in the flue gas. However, there are circumstances under which such reaction may not occur.

SO_{2} can further oxidize into sulfur trioxide (SO_{3}) when excess oxygen is present and gas temperatures are sufficiently high. At about 800 °C, formation of SO_{3} is favored. Another way that SO_{3} can be formed is through catalysis by metals in the fuel. Such reaction is particularly true for heavy fuel oil, where a significant amount of vanadium is present. In whatever way SO_{3} is formed, it does not behave like SO_{2} in that it forms a liquid aerosol known as sulfuric acid (H_{2}SO_{4}) mist that is very difficult to remove. Generally, about 1% of the sulfur dioxide will be converted to SO_{3}. Sulfuric acid mist is often the cause of the blue haze that often appears as the flue gas plume dissipates. Increasingly, this problem is being addressed by the use of wet electrostatic precipitators.

== FGD chemistry ==
=== Principles ===
Most FGD systems employ two stages: one for fly ash removal and the other for SO_{2} removal. Attempts have been made to remove both the fly ash and SO_{2} in one scrubbing vessel. However, these systems experienced severe maintenance problems and low removal efficiency. In wet scrubbing systems, the flue gas normally passes first through a fly ash removal device, either an electrostatic precipitator or a baghouse, and then into the SO_{2}-absorber. However, in dry injection or spray drying operations, the SO_{2} is first reacted with the lime, and then the flue gas passes through a particulate control device.

Another important design consideration associated with wet FGD systems is that the flue gas exiting the absorber is saturated with water and still contains some SO_{2}. These gases are highly corrosive to any downstream equipment such as fans, ducts, and stacks. Two methods that may minimize corrosion are: (1) reheating the gases to above their dew point, or (2) using materials of construction and designs that allow equipment to withstand the corrosive conditions. Both alternatives are expensive. Engineers determine which method to use on a site-by-site basis.

=== Scrubbing with an alkali solid or solution ===
Schematic design of the absorber of an FGD

SO_{2} is an acid gas, and, therefore, the typical sorbent slurries or other materials used to remove the SO_{2} from the flue gases are alkaline. The reaction taking place in wet scrubbing using a CaCO_{3} (limestone) slurry produces calcium sulfite (CaSO_{3}) and may be expressed in the simplified dry form as:

CaCO_{3} +SO_{2} → CaSO_{3} + CO_{2}

Wet scrubbing can be conducted with a Ca(OH)_{2} (hydrated lime) and Mg(OH)_{2}:

M(OH)_{2} + SO_{2} → MSO_{3} + H_{2}O (M = Ca, Mg)

To partially offset the cost of the FGD installation, some designs, particularly dry sorbent injection systems, further oxidize the CaSO_{3} (calcium sulfite) to produce marketable CaSO_{4}·2H_{2}O (gypsum) that can be of high enough quality to use in wallboard and other products. The process by which this synthetic gypsum is created is also known as forced oxidation:

2 CaSO_{3} + 2 H_{2}O + O_{2} → 2 CaSO_{4}·2H_{2}O

A natural alkaline usable to absorb SO_{2} is seawater. The SO_{2} is absorbed in the water, and when oxygen is added reacts to form sulfate ions SO^{2−}_{4} and free H^{+}. The surplus of H^{+} is offset by the carbonates in seawater pushing the carbonate equilibrium to release CO_{2} gas:

SO_{2} + H_{2}O + O →H_{2}SO_{4}

HCO^{−}_{3} + H^{+} → H_{2}O + CO_{2}

In industry caustic soda (NaOH) is often used to scrub SO_{2}, producing sodium sulfite:

2 NaOH + SO_{2} → Na_{2}SO_{3} +H_{2}O

==== Types of wet scrubbers used in FGD ====
To promote maximum gas–liquid surface area and residence time, a number of wet scrubber designs have been used, including spray towers, venturis, plate towers, and mobile packed beds. Because of scale buildup, plugging, or erosion, which affect FGD dependability and absorber efficiency, the trend is to use simple scrubbers such as spray towers instead of more complicated ones. The configuration of the tower may be vertical or horizontal, and flue gas can flow concurrently, countercurrently, or crosscurrently with respect to the liquid. The chief drawback of spray towers is that they require a higher liquid-to-gas ratio requirement for equivalent SO_{2} removal than other absorber designs.

FGD scrubbers produce a scaling wastewater that requires treatment to meet U.S. federal discharge regulations. However, technological advancements in ion-exchange membranes and electrodialysis systems has enabled high-efficiency treatment of FGD wastewater to meet EPA discharge limits. The treatment approach is similar for other highly scaling industrial wastewaters.

===== Venturi-rod scrubbers =====
A venturi scrubber is a converging/diverging section of duct. The converging section accelerates the gas stream to high velocity. When the liquid stream is injected at the throat, which is the point of maximum velocity, the turbulence caused by the high gas velocity atomizes the liquid into small droplets, which creates the surface area necessary for mass transfer to take place. The higher the pressure drop in the venturi, the smaller the droplets and the higher the surface area. The penalty is in power consumption.

For simultaneous removal of SO_{2} and fly ash, venturi scrubbers can be used. In fact, many of the industrial sodium-based throwaway systems are venturi scrubbers originally designed to remove particulate matter. These units were slightly modified to inject a sodium-based scrubbing liquor. Although removal of both particles and SO_{2} in one vessel can be economic, the problems of high pressure drops and finding a scrubbing medium to remove heavy loadings of fly ash must be considered. However, in cases where the particle concentration is low, such as from oil-fired units, it can be more effective to remove particulate and SO_{2} simultaneously.

===== Packed bed scrubbers =====
A packed scrubber consists of a tower with packing material inside. This packing material can be in the shape of saddles, rings, or some highly specialized shapes designed to maximize the contact area between the dirty gas and liquid. Packed towers typically operate at much lower pressure drops than venturi scrubbers and are therefore cheaper to operate. They also typically offer higher SO_{2} removal efficiency. The drawback is that they have a greater tendency to plug up if particles are present in excess in the exhaust air stream.

===== Spray towers =====
A spray tower is the simplest type of scrubber. It consists of a tower with spray nozzles, which generate the droplets for surface contact. Spray towers are typically used when circulating a slurry (see below). The high speed of a venturi would cause erosion problems, while a packed tower would plug up if it tried to circulate a slurry.

Counter-current packed towers are infrequently used because they have a tendency to become plugged by collected particles or to scale when lime or limestone scrubbing slurries are used.

==== Scrubbing reagent ====
As explained above, alkaline sorbents are used for scrubbing flue gases to remove SO_{2}. Depending on the application, the two most important are lime and sodium hydroxide (also known as caustic soda). Lime is typically used on large coal- or oil-fired boilers as found in power plants, as it is very much less expensive than caustic soda. The problem is that it results in a slurry being circulated through the scrubber instead of a solution. This makes it harder on the equipment. A spray tower is typically used for this application. The use of lime results in a slurry of calcium sulfite (CaSO_{3}) that must be disposed of. Calcium sulfite can be oxidized to produce by-product gypsum (CaSO_{4}·2H_{2}O) which is marketable for use in the building products industry.

Caustic soda is limited to smaller combustion units because it is more expensive than lime, but it has the advantage that it forms a solution rather than a slurry. This makes it easier to operate. It produces a "spent caustic" solution of sodium sulfite/bisulfite (depending on the pH), or sodium sulfate that must be disposed of. This is not a problem in a kraft pulp mill for example, where this can be a source of makeup chemicals to the recovery cycle.

=== Scrubbing with sodium sulfite solution ===
It is possible to scrub sulfur dioxide by using a cold solution of sodium sulfite; this forms a sodium hydrogen sulfite solution. By heating this solution it is possible to reverse the reaction to form sulfur dioxide and the sodium sulfite solution. Since the sodium sulfite solution is not consumed, it is called a regenerative treatment. The application of this reaction is also known as the Wellman–Lord process.

In some ways this can be thought of as being similar to the reversible liquid–liquid extraction of an inert gas such as xenon or radon (or some other solute which does not undergo a chemical change during the extraction) from water to another phase. While a chemical change does occur during the extraction of the sulfur dioxide from the gas mixture, it is the case that the extraction equilibrium is shifted by changing the temperature rather than by the use of a chemical reagent.

=== Gas-phase oxidation followed by reaction with ammonia ===
A new, emerging flue gas desulfurization technology has been described by the IAEA. It is a radiation technology where an intense beam of electrons is fired into the flue gas at the same time as ammonia is added to the gas. The Chendu power plant in China started up such a flue gas desulfurization unit on a 100 MW scale in 1998. The Pomorzany power plant in Poland also started up a similar sized unit in 2003 and that plant removes both sulfur and nitrogen oxides. Both plants are reported to be operating successfully. However, the accelerator design principles and manufacturing quality need further improvement for continuous operation in industrial conditions.

No radioactivity is required or created in the process. The electron beam is generated by a device similar to the electron gun in a TV set. This device is called an accelerator. This is an example of a radiation chemistry process where the physical effects of radiation are used to process a substance.

The action of the electron beam is to promote the oxidation of sulfur dioxide to sulfur(VI) compounds. The ammonia reacts with the sulfur compounds thus formed to produce ammonium sulfate, which can be used as a nitrogenous fertilizer. In addition, it can be used to lower the nitrogen oxide content of the flue gas. This method has attained industrial plant scale.

== Facts and statistics ==
The information in this section was obtained from a fact sheet published by the US EPA in 2003.

Flue gas desulfurization scrubbers have been applied to combustion units firing coal and oil that range in size from 5 MW to 1,500 MW. Scottish Power are spending £400 million installing FGD at Longannet power station, which has a capacity of over 2,000 MW. Dry scrubbers and spray scrubbers have generally been applied to units smaller than 300 MW.

FGD has been fitted by RWE npower at Aberthaw Power Station in south Wales using the seawater process and works successfully on the 1,580 MW plant.

Approximately 85% of the flue gas desulfurization units installed in the US are wet scrubbers, 12% are spray dry systems, and 3% are dry injection systems.

The highest SO_{2} removal efficiencies (greater than 90%) are achieved by wet scrubbers and the lowest (less than 80%) by dry scrubbers. However, the newer designs for dry scrubbers are capable of achieving efficiencies in the order of 90%.

In spray drying and dry injection systems, the flue gas must first be cooled to about 10–20 °C above adiabatic saturation to avoid wet solids deposition on downstream equipment and plugging of baghouses.

The capital, operating and maintenance costs per short ton of SO_{2} removed (in 2001 US dollars) are:

- For wet scrubbers larger than 400 MW, the cost is $200 to $500 per ton
- For wet scrubbers smaller than 400 MW, the cost is $500 to $5,000 per ton
- For spray dry scrubbers larger than 200 MW, the cost is $150 to $300 per ton
- For spray dry scrubbers smaller than 200 MW, the cost is $500 to $4,000 per ton

== Alternative methods of reducing sulfur dioxide emissions ==
An alternative to removing sulfur from the flue gases after burning is to remove the sulfur from the fuel before or during combustion. Hydrodesulfurization of fuel has been used for treating fuel oils before use. Fluidized bed combustion adds lime to the fuel during combustion. The lime reacts with the SO_{2} to form sulfates which become part of the ash.

This elemental sulfur is then separated and finally recovered at the end of the process for further usage in, for example, agricultural products. Safety is one of the greatest benefits of this method, as the whole process takes place at atmospheric pressure and ambient temperature. This method has been developed by Paqell, a joint venture between Shell Global Solutions and Paques.

== See also ==
- Incineration
- Scrubber
- Flue-gas emissions from fossil-fuel combustion
- Flue-gas stacks
- Wellman–Lord process
