= Microalgal bacterial flocs =

== MaB-flocs ==
Microalgae do not settle by gravity, therefore expensive harvesting techniques must be applied. This is a major bottleneck of microalgal technology. Bioflocculation of microalgae and bacteria addresses this.

MaB-flocs or Microalgal Bacterial flocs settle by gravity, up to density of 20 g per liter. This is a major improvement for microalgal technology for wastewater treatment.

Currently, MaB-flocs are being applied for sewage treatment on lab and pilot scale in Germany, New Zealand and Belgium. The idea is to scavenge nutrients such as nitrogen and phosphorus from the wastewater, sometimes combined with flue gas treatment.

Nutritional evaluation of such microbial protein or single cell protein as an unconventional protein feedstuff or ingredient in artificial animal feeds have gained much importance lately. Its nutritional strengths and bottlenecks are much described lately.

== Potential of MaB-flocs in Omega-3 Production ==
The integration of Microalgal Bacterial (MaB) flocs into sustainable agricultural practices presents an innovative approach to enhancing the nutritional content of food sources, particularly in terms of omega-3 fatty acids. Omega-3 fatty acids, such as Eicosapentaenoic acid (EPA) and Docosahexaenoic acid (DHA), are essential fats that humans must obtain from their diet. These fats are crucial for brain health, maintaining the health of cell membranes, and supporting cardiovascular health.

MaB-flocs, comprising both microalgae and bacteria, have shown promise in wastewater treatment applications by effectively removing nutrients such as nitrogen and phosphorus. Microalgae, a key component of MaB-flocs, are known for their ability to accumulate high levels of omega-3 fatty acids. This positions MaB-flocs as a potential sustainable source of these essential nutrients. The cultivation of microalgae within MaB-flocs for omega-3 production offers a dual benefit: improving water quality through nutrient removal and providing a source of essential dietary fats.

Current research focuses on optimizing the growth conditions of MaB-flocs to maximize the yield of omega-3 fatty acids. This includes investigating the effects of various environmental parameters, such as light intensity, temperature, and pH, on the fatty acid profile of microalgae within the flocs. Additionally, the feasibility of harvesting omega-3-rich microalgae from MaB-flocs for use in food and feed applications is being explored.

While the direct contribution of MaB-flocs to disease prevention through omega-3 production requires further research, their potential to serve as a sustainable source of these essential nutrients is clear. As the global demand for omega-3 fatty acids continues to rise, MaB-flocs represent a promising avenue for environmentally friendly production of these vital dietary components.
