= Fluidized bed scrubber =

A Fluidized Bed Scrubber system uses carefully selected hollow plastic elements of varying shapes, according to the process requirements, to generate a three phase fluidized bed in which increased Reynolds numbers (turbulence) in the gaseous phase, and the liquid phase, provoke an intense enhancement of turbulent action. This is claimed to lead to substantial increases in overall mass and heat transfer coefficients, and interphase surface renewal rates, as compared to classical packings and other scrubbing technologies (see below).

== Particulate removal ==
In addition, the fluid bed simultaneously removes particulates down to very fine sub half micron diameters. System design varies from application to application as process operations, or pollution control needs, vary widely.

== Quenching ==
When very hot gases are to be treated and cleaned using the fluidized bed scrubber technology, they are first passed through a quench chamber, which is usually integrated with the scrubber such that quenching can occur in two steps, using both the inlet quench section and a specially designed sump to maximum effect. The cooled gases are then passed on directly to the fluidized bed where ascending gas is intimately mixed by the fluidized packing elements with the descending, and usually recirculated, liquid.

== Applications ==
The fluidized bed scrubber system allows operation with slurries, muds and oily or viscous liquids due to the claimed 100% non-clogging nature of the fluidized bed.

== Comparisons ==
Below are two real case comparisons of equivalent efficiency alternative technologies commonly used in industrial applications.

=== Venturi and packed tower combination versus TURBOSCRUBBER ===
SYSTEM OPERATING DETAILS	TURBOSCRUBBER	VENTURI/PACKED TOWER
LIQUID MEDIUM	ESEAWATER OR 35% W/W KCI SLURRIES	SEAWATER ONLY
SO2 REMOVAL	99.8%	99.8%
KCI/C PARTICULATE REMOVAL @ 1.7 MICRON	99%	99%
PRESSURE DROP	6.4" W.G.	15" W.G.
RELATIVE VOLUME (APPROX)	1.0	5.0
PLUGGING/CLOGGING	NO	YES
SLURRY HEAT RECOVERY RATE	4.2MW	NONE POSSIBLE

=== A typical packed tower absorber versus Fluidized Bed Scrubbers ===
TOWER TYPE	TURBOSCRUBBER	FIXED PACK
PACKING	TURBOID	TYPICAL 2" RING
H2S REMOVAL	99.997	99.997
TYPICAL DIAMETER	1.25 METER	1.75 METER
ABSORPTION ZONE HEIGHT	2 METERS	7 METERS (FIXED)
PRESSURE DROP (APPROX)	6" W.G	6" W.G
PARTICLE REMOVAL @1.0 MICRON SIZE	>85%	BLOCKAGE

=== Images ===
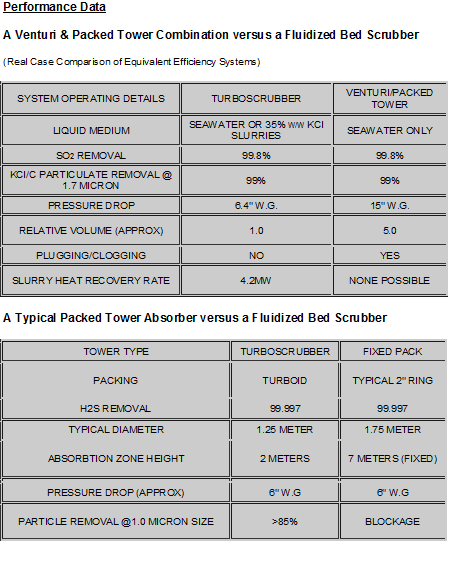
Performance Data

Fluid Bed Tower

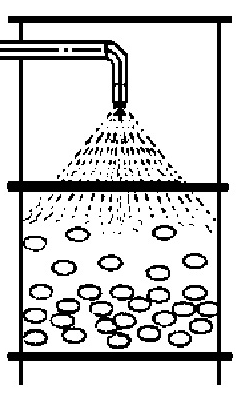
Fluid Bed Section
