= Wellman–Lord process =

The Wellman–Lord process is a regenerable process to remove sulfur dioxide from flue gas (flue-gas desulfurization) without creating a throwaway sludge product.

In this process, sulfur dioxide from flue gas is absorbed in a sodium sulfite solution in water forming sodium bisulfite; other components of flue gas are not absorbed. After lowering the temperature the bisulfite is converted to the sodium pyrosulfite which precipitates.

Upon heating, the two previously described chemical reactions are reversed, and sodium pyrosulfite is converted to a concentrated stream of sulfur dioxide and sodium sulfite. The sulfur dioxide can be used for further reactions (e.g. the production of sulfuric acid), and the sulfite is reintroduced into the process.

Na_{2}SO_{3} + SO_{2} + H_{2}O → 2NaHSO_{3}
2NaHSO_{3} → Na_{2}S_{2}O_{5}↓ + H_{2}O
Na_{2}S_{2}O_{5} + H_{2}O → 2NaHSO_{3}
2NaHSO_{3} → Na_{2}SO_{3} + SO_{2} + H_{2}O

In its initial version (Crane Station, Maryland, 1968) the process was based on potassium sulfite, but the economic prognosis was poor. Interest in the process occurred because of the worldwide shortage of sulfur in 1967 and resulting high prices; power-plant flue gas was viewed as an additional source of sulfur to relieve the shortage. the later version used sodium sulfite and was installed (as a demonstration system funded by USEPA) at Mitchell Station, Indiana in 1974. It was coupled with the Allied reduction (by natural gas) process to make elemental sulfur which can be shipped anywhere, for example to a sulfuric acid plant. Additional installations of W-L were made in New Mexico. The process has been offered commercially by Davy Powergas in Lakeland, Florida. Because of side reactions forming thiosulfate (nonregenerable), there is a small makeup requirement in the form of trona (sodium carbonate).
