= Quenching (scrubber) =

Cooling of exhaust gas before pollution scrubbing

Quenching, in the context of pollution scrubbers, is the cooling of hot exhaust gas by water sprays before it enters the scrubber proper. Hot gases (those above ambient temperature) are often cooled to near the saturation level. If not cooled, the hot gas stream can evaporate a large portion of the scrubbing liquor, adversely affecting collection efficiency and damaging scrubber internal parts. If the gases entering the scrubber are too hot, some liquid droplets may evaporate before they have a chance to contact pollutants in the exhaust stream, and others may evaporate after contact, causing captured particles to become reentrained. In some cases, quenching can actually save money. Cooling the gases reduces the temperature and, therefore, the volume of gases, permitting the use of less expensive construction materials and a smaller scrubber vessel and fan.

== Design ==
A quenching system can be as simple as spraying liquid into the duct just preceding the main scrubbing vessel, or it can be a separate chamber (or tower) with its own spray system identical to a spray tower. Quenchers are designed using the same principles as scrubbers. Increasing the gas-liquid contact in them increases their operational efficiency.

== Sizing ==
Small liquid droplets cool the exhaust stream more quickly than large droplets because they evaporate more easily. Therefore, less liquid is required. However, in most scrubbing systems, approximately one-and-a-half to two and- a-half times the theoretical evaporation demand is required to ensure proper cooling. Evaporation also depends on time; it does not occur instantaneously. Therefore, the quencher should be sized to allow for an adequate exhaust stream residence time. Normal residence times range from 0.15 to 0.25 seconds for gases under 540°C (1000°F) to 0.2 to 0.3 seconds for gases hotter than 540°C.

== Recirculation ==
Quenching with recirculated scrubber liquor could potentially reduce overall scrubber performance, since recycled liquid usually contains a high level of suspended and dissolved solids. As the liquid droplets evaporate, these solids could become re-entrained in the exhaust gas stream. To help reduce this problem, clean makeup water can be added directly to the quench system rather than adding all makeup water to a common sump.
