= Expansion ratio =

Ratio of substance volume between liquid and gaseous form

The expansion ratio of a liquefied and cryogenic substance is the volume of a given amount of that substance in liquid form compared to the volume of the same amount of substance in gaseous form, at room temperature and normal atmospheric pressure.

If a sufficient amount of liquid is vaporized within a closed container, it produces pressures that can rupture the pressure vessel. Hence the use of pressure relief valves and vent valves are important.

The expansion ratio of liquefied and cryogenic from the boiling point to ambient is:

- nitrogen – 1 to 696
- liquid helium – 1 to 745
- argon – 1 to 842
- liquid hydrogen – 1 to 850
- liquid oxygen – 1 to 860
- neon – Neon has the highest expansion ratio with 1 to 1445.

== See also ==
- Liquid-to-gas ratio
- Boiling liquid expanding vapor explosion
- Thermal expansion
