= Liquid-to-gas ratio =

An important parameter in wet scrubbing systems is the rate of liquid flow. It is common in wet scrubber terminology to express the liquid flow as a function of the gas flow rate that is being treated. This is commonly called the liquid-to-gas ratio (L/G ratio) and uses the units of gallons per 1,000 actual cubic feet or litres per cubic metre (L/m^{3}).

Expressing the amount of liquid used as a ratio enables systems of different sizes to be readily compared. For particulate removal, the liquid-to-gas ratio is a function of the mechanical design of the system; while for gas absorption this ratio gives an indication of the difficulty of removing a pollutant. Most wet scrubbers used for particulate control operate with liquid-to-gas ratios in the range of 4 to 20 gallons per 1,000 actual cubic foot (0.5 to 3 litres per actual cubic metre).

Depending on scrubber design, a minimum volume of liquid is required to "wet" the scrubber internals and create sufficient collection targets. After a certain optimum point, adding excess liquid to a particulate wet scrubber does not increase efficiency and in fact, could be counter-productive by causing excessive pressure loss. Liquid-to-gas ratios for gas absorption are often higher, in the range of 20 to 40 gallons per 1,000 actual cubic foot (3 to 6 litres per actual cubic metre).

L/G ratio illustrates a number of points about the choice of wet scrubbers used for gas absorption. For example, because flue-gas desulfurization systems must deal with heavy particulate loadings, open, simple designs (such as venturi, spray chamber and moving bed) are used. Also, the liquid-to-gas ratio for the absorption process is higher than for particle removal and gas velocities are kept low to enhance the absorption process.

Solubility is a very important factor affecting the amount of a pollutant that can be absorbed. Solubility governs the amount of liquid required (liquid-to-gas ratio) and the necessary contact time. More soluble gases require less liquid. Also, more soluble gases will be absorbed faster.

== Bibliography ==
- Bethea, R. M. 1978. Air Pollution Control Technology. New York: Van Nostrand Reinhold.
- National Asphalt Pavement Association. 1978. The Maintenance and Operation of Exhaust Systems in the Hot Mix Batch Plant. 2nd ed. Information Series 52.
- Perry, J. H. (Ed.). 1973. Chemical Engineers’ Handbook. 5th ed. New York: McGraw-Hill.
- Richards, J. R. 1995. Control of Particulate Emissions (APTI Course 413). U.S. Environmental Protection Agency.
- Richards, J. R. 1995. Control of Gaseous Emissions. (APTI Course 415). U.S. Environmental Protection Agency.
- Schifftner, K. C. 1979, April. Venturi scrubber operation and maintenance. Paper presented at the U.S. EPA Environmental Research Information Center. Atlanta, GA.
- Semrau, K. T. 1977. Practical process design of particulate scrubbers. Chemical Engineering. 84:87-91.
- U.S. Environmental Protection Agency. 1982, September. Control Techniques for Particulate Emissions from Stationary Sources. Vol. 1. EPA 450/3-81-005a.
- Wechselblatt, P. M. 1975. Wet scrubbers (particulates). In F. L. Cross and H. E. Hesketh (Eds.), Handbook for the Operation and Maintenance of Air Pollution Control Equipment. Westport: Technomic Publishing.

== See also ==
- Expansion ratio
