= Culligan Quench =

American water technology company

- Type: Subsidiary
- Industry: Water Filtration and Related Products
- Headquarters: King of Prussia, Pennsylvania
- Key people: Todd Peterson (President), Thomas Breslin (CAO), Andy Corr (COO), Melissa Marra (CFO)
- Products: Water coolers; Water dispensers; Ice dispensers; Carbonated Water Machines Coffee Machines
- Parent: Culligan Water
- Website: https://quench.culligan.com/

Culligan Quench is a water technology company that rents and services filtered water coolers, sparkling water, ice machines, and coffee dispensers to workplaces. The company became a subsidiary of Culligan through Culligan’s acquisition of AquaVenture Holdings in 2019. According to the site, over half of the Fortune 500 are customers. Zenith International lists Quench as a leading distributor in the point-of-use (POU) market along with Macke Water Systems and Nestle Waters. Quench is an independent operating company of AquaVenture Holdings. Quench is headquartered in King of Prussia, Pennsylvania. Quench was named an Online Marketing Success Story in Google's 2011 Economic Impact Report. In 2008, Quench was named a top 25 most successful startup by Businessweek.

== Products description ==
Filtered water systems are plumbed into a building's water supply and purified at the last possible point before consumption. Filter water coolers and ice dispensers typically use carbon filtration, UV water disinfection and/or reverse osmosis to purify drinking water. Culligan Quench also offers coffee machines, and sparkling water machines with similar filtration technology.

During the COVID-19 outbreak, Culligan Quench launched a line of touchless water coolers and dispenser to reduce touchpoints in office spaces.

== Acquisitions ==
In March 2012, Quench purchased Aqua Perfect of Arizona LLC.

In April 2014, Quench acquired Macke Water Systems.

In June 2014, Quench acquired Atlas Watersystems.

In July 2015, Quench acquired Region-X LLC a Massachusetts company that provides services related to high purity water systems

In December 2018, Quench acquired Bluline, a point-of-use water filtration dealer and distributor based in South Florida.

In February 2025, Culligan Quench acquired Stonybrook Water Company, a water and ice appliance supplier, based in Massachusetts.
