= Spray tower =

Gas-liquid contactor

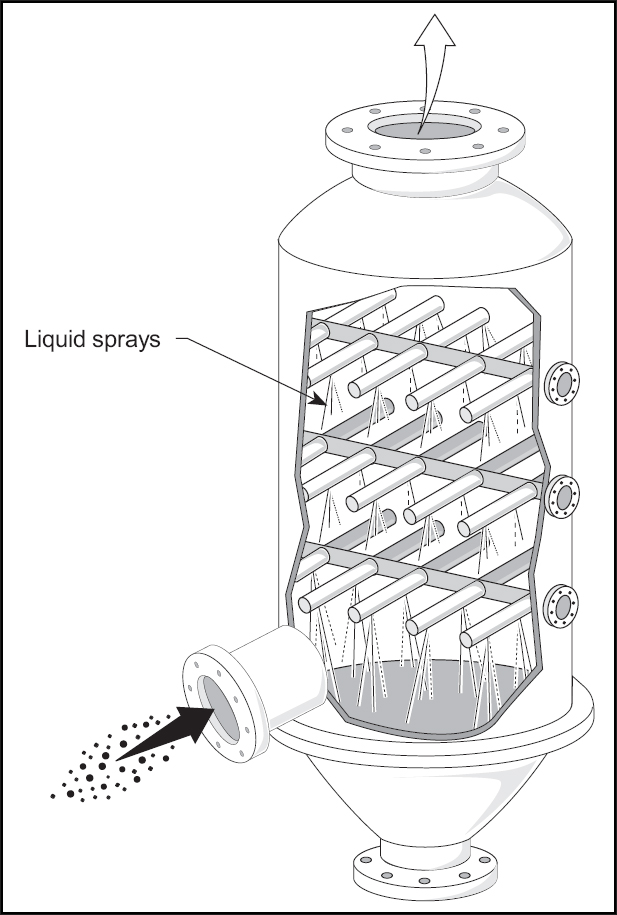
Typical countercurrent-flow spray tower.

A spray tower (or spray column or spray chamber) is a gas-liquid contactor used to achieve mass and heat transfer between a continuous gas phase (that can contain dispersed solid particles) and a dispersed liquid phase. It consists of an empty cylindrical vessel made of steel or plastic, and nozzles that spray liquid into the vessel. The inlet gas stream usually enters at the bottom of the tower and moves upward, while the liquid is sprayed downward from one or more levels. This flow of inlet gas and liquid in opposite directions is called countercurrent flow.

== Overview ==
This type of technology can be used for example as a wet scrubber for air pollution control. Countercurrent flow exposes the outlet gas with the lowest pollutant concentration to the freshest scrubbing liquid. Many nozzles are placed across the tower at different heights to spray all of the gas as it moves up through the tower. The reason for using many nozzles is to maximize the number of fine droplets impacting the pollutant particles and to provide a large surface area for absorbing gas.

Theoretically, the smaller the droplets formed, the higher the collection efficiency achieved for both gaseous and particulate pollutants. However, the liquid droplets must be large enough to not be carried out of the scrubber by the scrubbed outlet gas stream. Therefore, spray towers use nozzles that produce droplets that are usually 500–1000 μm in diameter. Although small in size, these droplets are large compared to those created in venturi scrubbers that are 10–50 μm in size. The gas velocity is kept low, from 0.3 to 1.2 m/s (1–4 ft/s), to prevent excess droplets from being carried out of the tower.

In order to maintain low gas velocities, spray towers must be larger than other scrubbers that handle similar gas stream flow rates. Another problem occurring in spray towers is that after the droplets have fallen a short distance, they tend to agglomerate or hit the walls of the tower. Consequently, the total liquid surface area for contact is reduced, reducing the collection efficiency of the scrubber.

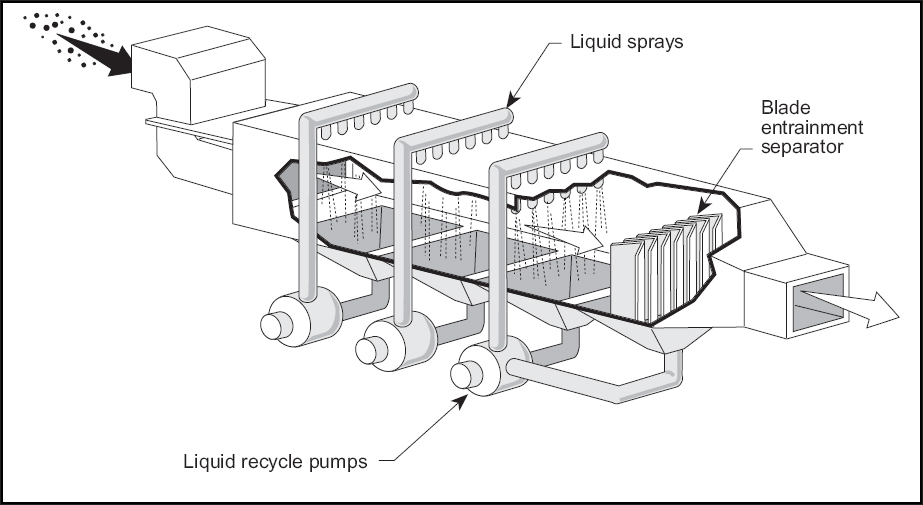
Crosscurrent-flow spray tower

In addition to a countercurrent-flow configuration, the flow in spray towers can be either a cocurrent or crosscurrent in configuration.

In cocurrent-flow spray towers, the inlet gas and liquid flow in the same direction. Because the gas stream does not "push" against the liquid sprays, the gas velocities through the vessels are higher than in countercurrent-flow spray towers. Consequently, cocurrent-flow spray towers are smaller than countercurrent-flow spray towers treating the same amount of exhaust flow. In crosscurrent-flow spray towers, also called horizontal-spray scrubbers, the gas and liquid flow in directions perpendicular to each other.

In this vessel, the gas flows horizontally through a number of spray sections. The amount and quality of liquid sprayed in each section can be varied, usually with the cleanest liquid (if recycled liquid is used) sprayed in the last set of sprays.

== Particle collection ==
Spray towers are low energy scrubbers. Contacting power is much lower than in venturi scrubbers, and the pressure drops across such systems are generally less than 2.5 cm (0.98 in) of water. The collection efficiency for small particles is correspondingly lower than in more energy-intensive devices. They are adequate for the collection of coarse particles larger than 10–25 μm in diameter, although with increased liquid inlet nozzle pressures, particles with diameters of 2.0 μm can be collected.

Smaller droplets can be formed by higher liquid pressures at the nozzle. The highest collection efficiencies are achieved when small droplets are produced and the difference between the velocity of the droplet and the velocity of the upward-moving particles is high. Small droplets, however, have small settling velocities, so there is an optimum range of droplet sizes for scrubbers that work by this mechanism.

This range of droplet sizes is between 500 and 1,000 μm for gravity-spray (counter current) towers. The injection of water at very high pressures – 2,070–3,100 kPa (300–450 psi) – creates a fog of very fine droplets. Higher particle-collection efficiencies can be achieved in such cases since collection mechanisms other than inertial impaction occur. However, these spray nozzles may use more power to form droplets than would a venturi operating at the same collection efficiency.

== Gas collection ==
Spray towers can be used for gas absorption, but they are not as effective as packed or plate towers. Spray towers can be very effective in removing pollutants if the pollutants are highly soluble or if a chemical reagent is added to the liquid.

For example, spray towers are used to remove HCl gas from the tail-gas exhaust in manufacturing hydrochloric acid. In the production of superphosphate used in manufacturing fertilizer, SiF_{4} and HF gases are vented from various points in the processes. Spray towers have been used to remove these highly soluble compounds. Spray towers are also used for odor removal in bone meal and tallow manufacturing industries by scrubbing the exhaust gases with a solution of KMnO_{4}.

Because of their ability to handle large gas volumes in corrosive atmospheres, spray towers are also used in a number of flue-gas desulfurization systems as the first or second stage in the pollutant removal process.

In a spray tower, absorption can be increased by decreasing the size of the liquid droplets and/or increasing the liquid-to-gas ratio (L/G). However, to accomplish either of these, an increase in both power consumed and operating cost is required. In addition, the physical size of the spray tower will limit the amount of liquid and the size of droplets that can be used.

== Maintenance problems ==
The main advantage of spray towers over other scrubbers is their completely open design; they have no internal parts except for the spray nozzles. This feature eliminates many of the scale buildup and plugging problems associated with other scrubbers. The primary maintenance problems are spray-nozzle plugging or eroding, especially when using recycled scrubber liquid. To reduce these problems, a settling or filtration system is used to remove abrasive particles from the recycled scrubbing liquid before pumping it back into the nozzles.

== Summary ==
Spray towers are inexpensive control devices primarily used for gas conditioning (cooling or humidifying) or for first-stage particle or gas removal. They are also used in many flue-gas desulfurization systems to reduce plugging and scale buildup by pollutants.

Many scrubbing systems use sprays either prior to or in the bottom of the primary scrubber to remove large particles that could plug it.

Spray towers have been used effectively to remove large particles and highly soluble gases. The pressure drop across the towers is very low – usually less than 2.5 cm (0.98 in) of water; thus, scrubber operating costs are relatively low. However, the liquid pumping costs can be very high.

Spray towers are constructed in various sizes – small ones to handle small gas flows of 0.05 m^{3}/s (106 ft^{3}/min) or less, and large ones to handle large exhaust flows of 50 m^{3}/s (106,000 m^{3}/min) or greater. Because of the low gas velocity required, units handling large gas flow rates tend to be large in size. Operating characteristics of spray towers are presented in the following table.

Operating characteristics of spray towers
Pollutant	Pressure drop (Δp)	Liquid-to-gas ratio (L/G)	Liquid-inlet pressure (p_{L})	Removal efficiency	Applications
Gases	1.3–7.6 cm of water	0.07–2.70 L/m^{3} (0.5–20 gal/1,000 ft^{3})	70–2800 kPa	50–90^{+}% (high efficiency only when the gas is very soluble)	Mining industries Chemical process industry Boilers and incinerators Iron and steel industry
Particles	0.5–3.0 in of water	5 gal/1,000 ft^{3} is normal; >10 when using pressure sprays	10–400 psig	2–8 μm diameter	Mining industries Chemical process industry Boilers and incinerators Iron and steel industry

== Bibliography ==
- Gilbert, J. W. 1977. Jet venturi fume scrubbing. In P. N. Cheremisinoff and R. A. Young (Eds.), Air Pollution Control and Design Handbook. Part 2. New York: Marcel Dekker.
- McIlvaine Company. 1974. The Wet Scrubber Handbook. Northbrook, IL: McIlvaine Company.
- Richards, J. R. 1995. Control of Particulate Emissions (APTI Course 413). U.S. Environmental Protection Agency.
- Richards, J. R. 1995. Control of Gaseous Emissions. (APTI Course 415). U.S. Environmental Protection Agency.
