= Wet scrubber =

Pollutant remover device

The term wet scrubber describes a variety of devices that remove pollutants from a furnace flue gas or from other gas streams. In a wet scrubber, the polluted gas stream is brought into contact with the scrubbing liquid, by spraying it with the liquid, by forcing it through a pool of liquid, or by some other contact method, so as to remove the pollutants.

Wet scrubbers capture relatively small dust particles with the wet scrubber's large liquid droplets. In most wet scrubbing systems, droplets produced are generally larger than 50 micrometres (in the 150 to 500 micrometres range). As a point of reference, human hair ranges in diameter from 50 to 100 micrometres. The size distribution of particles to be collected is source specific.

For example, particles produced by mechanical means (crushing or grinding) tend to be large (above 10 micrometres); whereas, particles produced from combustion or a chemical reaction will have a substantial portion of small (less than 5 micrometres) and submicrometre particles.

The most critical sized particles are those in the 0.1 to 0.5 micrometres range because they are the most difficult for wet scrubbers to collect.

== Design ==
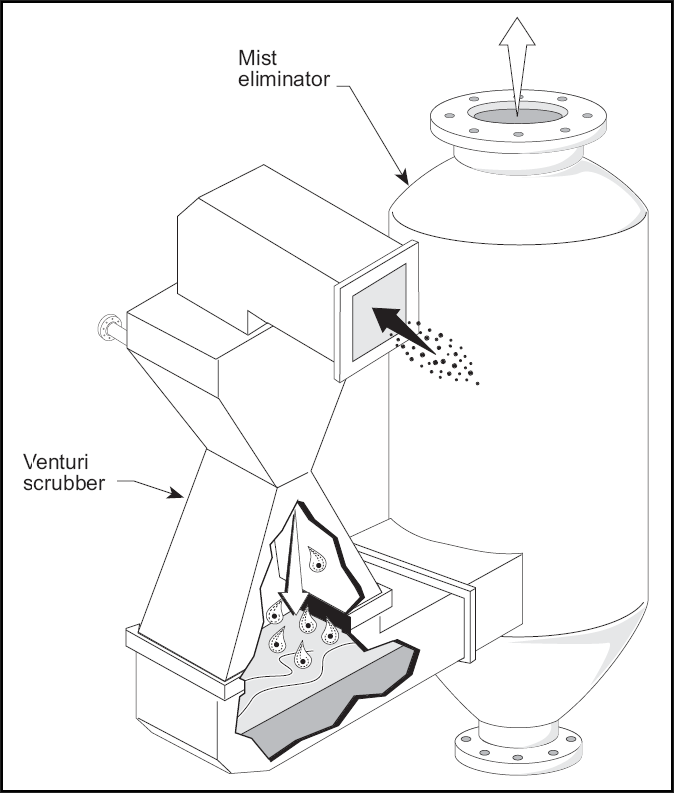
A venturi scrubber design. The mist eliminator for a venturi scrubber is often a separate device called a cyclonic separator

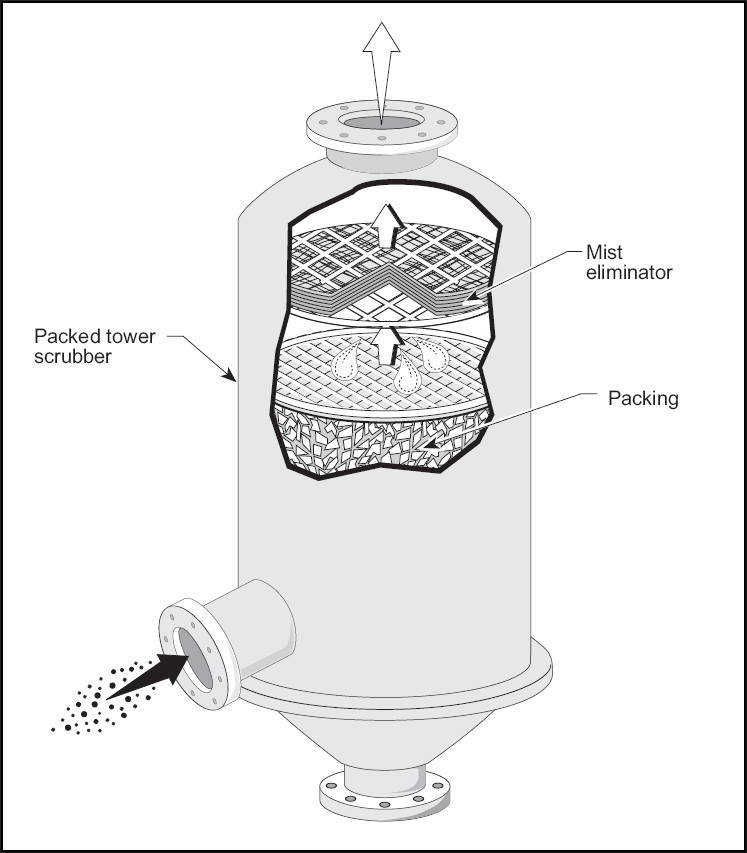
A packed bed tower design where the mist eliminator is built into the top of the structure. Various tower designs exist

The design of wet scrubbers or any air pollution control device depends on the industrial process conditions and the nature of the air pollutants involved. Inlet gas characteristics and dust properties (if particles are present) are of primary importance. Scrubbers can be designed to collect particulate matter and/or gaseous pollutants. The versatility of wet scrubbers allow them to be built in numerous configurations, all designed to provide good contact between the liquid and polluted gas stream.

Wet scrubbers remove dust particles by capturing them in liquid droplets. The droplets are then collected, the liquid dissolving or absorbing the pollutant gases. Any droplets that are in the scrubber inlet gas must be separated from the outlet gas stream by means of another device referred to as a mist eliminator or entrainment separator (these terms are interchangeable). Also, the resultant scrubbing liquid must be treated prior to any ultimate discharge or being reused in the plant.

A wet scrubber's ability to collect small particles is often directly proportional to the power input into the scrubber. Low energy devices such as spray towers are used to collect particles larger than 5 micrometers. To obtain high efficiency removal of 1 micrometer (or less) particles generally requires high-energy devices such as venturi scrubbers or augmented devices such as condensation scrubbers. Additionally, a properly designed and operated entrainment separator or mist eliminator is important to achieve high removal efficiencies. The greater the number of liquid droplets that are not captured by the mist eliminator, the higher the potential emission levels.

Wet scrubbers that remove gaseous pollutants are referred to as absorbers. Good gas-to-liquid contact is essential to obtain high removal efficiencies in absorbers. Various wet-scrubber designs are used to remove gaseous pollutants, with the packed tower and the plate tower being the most common.

If the gas stream contains both particulate matter and gases, wet scrubbers are generally the only single air pollution control device that can remove both pollutants. Wet scrubbers can achieve high removal efficiencies for either particles or gases and, in some instances, can achieve a high removal efficiency for both pollutants in the same system. However, in many cases, the best operating conditions for particles collection are the poorest for gas removal.

In general, obtaining high simultaneous gas and particulate removal efficiencies requires that one of them be easily collected (i.e., that the gases are very soluble in the liquid or that the particles are large and readily captured), or by the use of a scrubbing reagent such as lime or sodium hydroxide.

The "cleaned" gases are normally passed through a mist eliminator (demister pads) to remove water droplets from the gas stream. The dirty water from the scrubber system is either cleaned and discharged or recycled to the scrubber. Dust is removed from the scrubber in a clarification unit or a drag chain tank. In both systems solid material settles on the bottom of the tank. A drag chain conveyor system removes the sludge and deposits in into a dumpster or stockpile.

== Droplet production ==
Droplets are produced by several methods:

1. Injecting liquid at high pressure through specially designed nozzles
2. Aspirating the particle-laden gas stream through a liquid pool
3. Submerging a whirling rotor in a liquid pool.

These droplets collect particles by using one or more of several collection mechanisms such as impaction, direct interception, diffusion, electrostatic attraction, condensation, centrifugal force and gravity. However, impaction and diffusion are the main ones.

=== Impaction ===
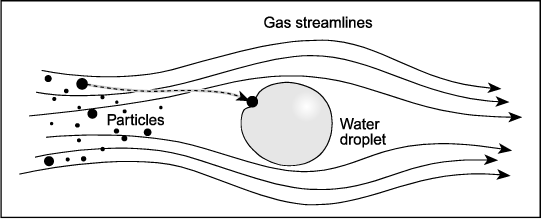
Figure 1 - Impaction

In a wet scrubbing system, dust particles will tend to follow the streamlines of the exhaust stream. However, when liquid droplets are introduced into the exhaust stream, particles cannot always follow these streamlines as they diverge around the droplet (Figure 1). The particle's mass causes it to break away from the streamlines and impact or hit the droplet.

Impaction increases as the diameter of the particle increases and as the relative velocity between the particle and droplets increases. As particles get larger they are less likely to follow the gas streamlines around droplets. Also, as particles move faster relative to the liquid droplet, there is a greater chance that the particle will hit a droplet. Impaction is the predominant collection mechanism for scrubbers having gas stream velocities greater than 0.3 m/s (1 ft/s) (Perry 1973).

Most scrubbers operate with gas stream velocities well above 0.3 m/s. Therefore, at these velocities, particles having diameters greater than 1.0 μm are collected by this mechanism. Impaction also increases as the size of the liquid droplet decreases because the presence of more droplets within the vessel increases the probability that particles will impact on the droplets.

=== Diffusion ===
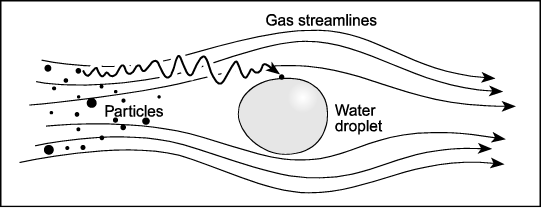
Figure 2 - Diffusion

Very small particles (less than 0.1 μm in diameter) experience random movement in an exhaust stream. These particles are so tiny that they are bumped by gas molecules as they move in the exhaust stream. This bumping, or bombardment, causes them to first move one way and then another in a random manner, or to diffuse, through the gas. This irregular motion can cause the particles to collide with a droplet and be collected (Figure 2). Because of this, diffusion is the primary collection mechanism in wet scrubbers for particles smaller than 0.1 μm.

The rate of diffusion depends on the following:

1. The relative velocity between the particle and droplet
2. The particle diameter
3. The liquid-droplet diameter.

For both impaction and diffusion, collection efficiency increases with an increase in relative velocity (liquid- or gas-pressure input) and a decrease in liquid-droplet size.

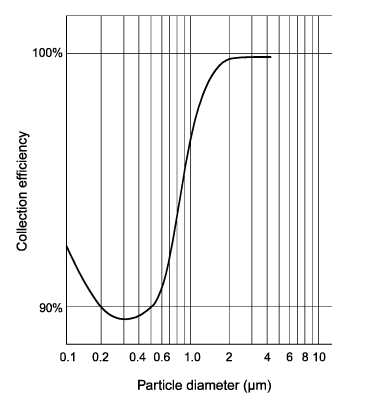
Figure 3 - Hypothetical curve illustrating relationship between particle size and collection efficiency for a typical wet scrubber

However, collection by diffusion increases as particle size decreases. This mechanism enables certain scrubbers to effectively remove the very tiny particles (less than 0.1 μm).

In the particle size range of approximately 0.1 to 1.0 μm, neither of these two collection mechanisms (impaction or diffusion) dominates. This relationship is illustrated in Figure 3.

=== Other collection mechanisms ===
In recent years, some scrubber manufacturers have utilized other collection mechanisms such as electrostatic attraction and condensation to enhance particle collection without increasing power consumption.

In electrostatic attraction, particles are captured by first inducing a charge on them. Then, the charged particles are either attracted to each other, forming larger, easier-to-collect particles, or they are collected on a surface.

Condensation of water vapor on particles promotes collection by adding mass to the particles. Other mechanisms such as gravity, centrifugal force, and direct interception slightly affect particle collection.

== Advantages and disadvantages ==
For particulate control, wet scrubbers (also referred to as wet collectors) are evaluated against fabric filters and electrostatic precipitators (ESPs). Some advantages of wet scrubbers over these devices are as follows:

- Wet scrubbers have the ability to handle high temperatures and moisture.
- In wet scrubbers, flue gases are cooled, resulting in smaller overall size of equipment.
- Wet scrubbers can remove both gases and particulate matter.
- Wet scrubbers can neutralize corrosive gases

Some disadvantages of wet scrubbers include corrosion, the need for entrainment separation or mist removal to obtain high efficiencies and the need for treatment or reuse of spent liquid.

Wet scrubbers have been used in a variety of industries such as acid plants, fertilizer plants, steel mills, asphalt plants, and large power plants.

Relative advantages and disadvantages of wet scrubbers compared to other control devices
Advantages	Disadvantages
Small space requirements: Scrubbers reduce the temperature and volume of the unsaturated exhaust stream. Therefore, vessel sizes, including fans and ducts downstream, are smaller than those of other control devices. Smaller sizes result in lower capital costs and more flexibility in site location of the scrubber.; No secondary dust sources: Once particulate matter is collected, it cannot escape from hoppers or during transport.; Handles high-temperature, high-humidity gas streams: No temperature limits or condensation problems can occur as in baghouses or ESPs.; Minimal fire and explosion hazards: Various dry dusts are flammable. Using water eliminates the possibility of explosions.; Ability to collect both gases and particulate matter.	Corrosion problems: Water and dissolved pollutants can form highly corrosive acid solutions. Proper construction materials are very important. Also, wet-dry interface areas can result in corrosion.; High power requirements: High collection efficiencies for particulate matter are attainable only at high pressure drops, resulting in high operating costs.; Water pollution problems: ash ponds, settling ponds or sludge clarifiers may be needed to meet wastewater regulations.; Difficult product recovery: Dewatering and drying of scrubber sludge make recovery of any dust for reuse very expensive and difficult.

== Components ==
Some components that are specific to the wet scrubbing process include:

- venturi scrubber
- spray chamber/tower
- cyclonic spray scrubber
- packed bed
- ejector venturi scrubber

A system may include one or multiple of these components in addition to various supporting components such as:

- Ductwork and fan system
- A saturation chamber (optional)
- Entrainment separator or mist eliminator
- Pumping (and possible recycle system)
- Spent scrubbing liquid treatment and/or reuse system
- An exhaust stack

A typical wet scrubbing process can be described as follows:

- Hot flue gas from a furnace enters a saturator (if present) where gases are cooled and humidified prior to entering the scrubbing area. The saturator removes a small percentage of the particulate matter present in the flue gas.
- Next, the gas enters a venturi scrubber where approximately half of the gases are removed. Venturi scrubbers have a minimum particle removal efficiency of 95%.
- The gas flows through a second scrubber, a packed bed absorber, where the rest of the gases (and particulate matter) are collected.
- An entrainment separator or mist eliminator removes any liquid droplets that may have become entrained in the flue gas.
- A recirculation pump moves some of the spent scrubbing liquid back to the venturi scrubber where it is recycled and the remainder is sent to a treatment system.
- Treated scrubbing liquid is recycled back to the saturator and the packed bed absorber.
- Fans and ductwork move the flue gas stream through the system and eventually out the stack.

== Categorization ==
=== By configuration ===
Wet scrubbers can be categorized by the manner in which the gas and liquid phases are brought into contact. Scrubbers are designed to use power, or energy, from the gas stream or the liquid stream, or some other method to bring the pollutant gas stream into contact with the liquid. These categories are given in the table below.

Categories of wet collectors by energy source used for contact
Wet collector	Energy source used for gas-liquid contact
Gas-phase contacting; Liquid-phase contacting; Wet film; Combination; Liquid phase and gas phase; Mechanically aided	Gas stream; Liquid stream; Liquid and gas streams; Energy source: Liquid and gas streams; Mechanically driven rotor

There is a large variety of wet scrubbers; however, all have one of three basic configurations:

1. Gas-humidification - The gas-humidification process agglomerates fine particles, increasing the bulk, making collection easier.
2. Gas-liquid contact - This is one of the most important factors affecting collection efficiency. The particle and droplet come into contact by four primary mechanisms:
  - Inertial impaction - When water droplets placed in the path of a dust-laden gas stream, the stream separates and flows around them. Due to inertia, the larger dust particles will continue on in a straight path, hit the droplets, and become encapsulated.
  - Interception - Finer particles moving within a gas stream do not hit droplets directly but brush against and adhere to them.
  - Diffusion - When liquid droplets are scattered among dust particles, the particles are deposited on the droplet surfaces by Brownian movement, or diffusion. This is the principal mechanism in the collection of submicrometre dust particles.
  - Condensation nucleation - If a gas passing through a scrubber is cooled below the dewpoint, condensation of moisture occurs on the dust particles. This increase in particle size makes collection easier.
3. Gas-liquid separation - Regardless of the contact mechanism used, as much liquid and dust as possible must be removed. Once contact is made, dust particulates and water droplets combine to form agglomerates. As the agglomerates grow larger, they settle into a collector.

=== By energy ===
Since wet scrubbers vary greatly in complexity and method of operation, devising categories into which all of them neatly fit is extremely difficult. Scrubbers for particle collection are usually categorized by the gas-side pressure drop of the system. Gas-side pressure drop refers to the pressure difference, or pressure drop, that occurs as the exhaust gas is pushed or pulled through the scrubber, disregarding the pressure that would be used for pumping or spraying the liquid into the scrubber.

Spray-tower scrubber wet scrubbers may be categorized by pressure drop as follows:

- Low-energy scrubbers (0.5 to 2.5 inches water gauge - 124.4 to 621.9 Pa)
- Low- to medium-energy scrubbers (2.5 to 6 inches water gauge - 0.622 to 1.493 kPa)
- Medium- to high-energy scrubbers (6 to 15 inches water gauge - 1.493 to 3.731 kPa)
- High-energy scrubbers (greater than 15 inches water gauge - greater than 3.731 kPa)

However, most scrubbers operate over a wide range of pressure drops, depending on their specific application, thereby making this type of categorization difficult. In addition to energy consumption, some wet scrubber systems are designed to recover energy (waste heat). By integrating heat exchangers or heat pumps, it is possible to reuse thermal energy from the cleaned gas stream, which can reduce overall energy demand of the facility.

Due to the large number of commercial scrubbers available, it is not possible to describe each individual type here. However, the following sections provide examples of typical scrubbers in each category.

==== Low-energy scrubbers ====
In the simple, gravity-spray-tower scrubber, liquid droplets formed by liquid atomized in spray nozzles fall through rising exhaust gases. Dirty water is drained at the bottom.

These scrubbers operated at pressure drops of 1 to 2 in. water gauge (¼ to ½ kPa) and are approximately 70% efficient on 10 μm particles. Their efficiency is poor below 10 μm. However, they are capable of treating relatively high dust concentrations without becoming plugged.

==== Low- to medium-energy scrubbers ====
Wet cyclones use centrifugal force to spin the dust particles (similar to a cyclone), and throw the particulates upon the collector's wetted walls. Water introduced from the top to wet the cyclone walls carries these particles away. The wetted walls also prevent dust reentrainment.

Pressure drops for these collectors range from 2 to 8 in. water (½ to 2 kPa), and the collection efficiency is good for 5 μm particles and above.

==== High-energy scrubbers co-current-flow scrubber ====
Packed-bed scrubbers consist of beds of packing elements, such as coke, broken rock, rings, saddles, or other manufactured elements. The packing breaks down the liquid flow into a high-surface-area film so that the dusty gas streams passing through the bed achieve maximum contact with the liquid film and become deposited on the surfaces of the packing elements. These scrubbers have a good collection efficiency for respirable dust.

Three types of packed-bed scrubbers are:

- Cross-flow scrubbers
- Co-current flow scrubbers
- Counter-current flow scrubbers

Efficiency can be greatly increased by minimizing target size, i.e., using 0.003 in. (0.076 mm) diameter stainless steel wire and increasing gas velocity to more than 1,800 ft/min (9.14 m/s).

==== High-energy scrubbers ====
Venturi scrubbers consist of a venturi-shaped inlet and separator. The dust-laden gases venturi scrubber enter through the venturi and are accelerated to speeds between 12,000 and 36,000 ft/min (60.97-182.83 m/s). These high-gas velocities immediately atomize the coarse water spray, which is injected radially into the venturi throat, into fine droplets. High energy and extreme turbulence promote collision between water droplets and dust particulates in the throat. The agglomeration process between particle and droplet continues in the diverging section of the venturi. The large agglomerates formed in the venturi are then removed by an inertial separator.

Venturi scrubbers achieve very high collection efficiencies for respirable dust. Since efficiency of a venturi scrubber depends on pressure drop, some manufacturers supply a variable-throat venturi to maintain pressure drop with varying gas flows.

=== By use ===
Another way to classify wet scrubbers is by their use - to primarily collect either particulates or gaseous pollutants. Again, this distinction is not always clear since scrubbers can often be used to remove both types of pollutants.

== Material of construction and design ==
Corrosion can be a prime problem associated with chemical industry scrubbing systems. Fibre-reinforced plastic and dual laminates are often used for their corrosion resistance.

== Bibliography ==
*Bethea, R. M. 1978. Air Pollution Control Technology. New York: Van Nostrand Reinhold.
- National Asphalt Pavement Association. 1978. The Maintenance and Operation of Exhaust Systems in the Hot Mix Batch Plant. 2nd ed. Information Series 52.
- Perry, J. H. (Ed.). 1973. Chemical Engineers’ Handbook. 5th ed. New York: McGraw-Hill.
- Richards, J. R. 1995. Control of Particulate Emissions (APTI Course 413). U.S. Environmental Protection Agency.
- Richards, J. R. 1995. Control of Gaseous Emissions. (APTI Course 415). U.S. Environmental Protection Agency.
- Schifftner, K. C. 1979, April. Venturi scrubber operation and maintenance. Paper presented at the U.S. EPA Environmental Research Information Center. Atlanta, GA.
- Semrau, K. T. 1977. Practical process design of particulate scrubbers. Chemical Engineering. 84:87-91.
- U.S. Environmental Protection Agency. 1982, September. Control Techniques for Particulate Emissions from Stationary Sources. Vol. 1. EPA 450/3-81-005a.
- Wechselblatt, P. M. 1975. Wet scrubbers (particulates). In F. L. Cross and H. E. Hesketh (Eds.), Handbook for the Operation and Maintenance of Air Pollution Control Equipment. Westport: Technomic Publishing.
