= Flue gas =

Gas exiting to the atmosphere via a flue

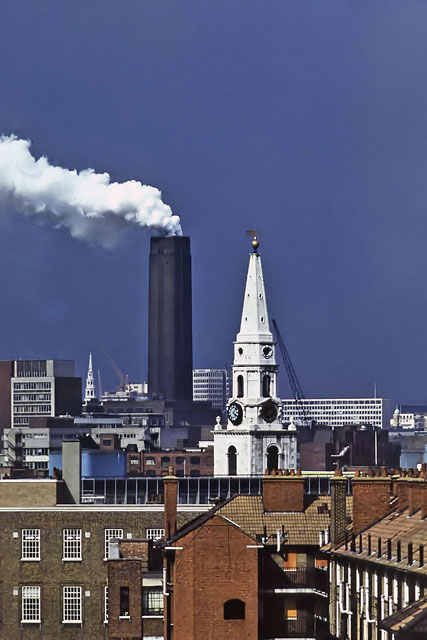
Flue gas from London's Bankside Power Station, 1975

Flue gas is the gas exiting to the atmosphere via a flue, which is a pipe or channel for conveying exhaust gases, as from a fireplace, oven, furnace, boiler or steam generator. It often refers to the exhaust gas of combustion at power plants. Technology is available to remove pollutants from flue gas at power plants.

Combustion of fossil fuels is a common source of flue gas. They are usually combusted with ambient air, with the largest part of the flue gas from most fossil-fuel combustion being nitrogen, carbon dioxide, and water vapor.

== Description ==
Flue gas is the gas exiting to the atmosphere via a flue, which is a pipe or channel for conveying exhaust gases from combustion, as from a fireplace, oven, furnace, boiler or steam generator. The term can also be used to refer to the gas produced from chemical or physical processes that do not involve combustion, such as natural gas processing.

== Power plants ==
Quite often, the flue gas refers to the combustion exhaust gas produced at power plants. Its composition depends on what is being burned, but it will usually consist of mostly nitrogen (typically more than two-thirds) derived from the combustion of air, carbon dioxide (CO_{2}), and water vapor as well as excess oxygen (also derived from the combustion air). It further contains a small percentage of a number of pollutants, such as particulate matter (like soot), carbon monoxide, nitrogen oxides, and sulfur oxides.

=== Scrubbing ===
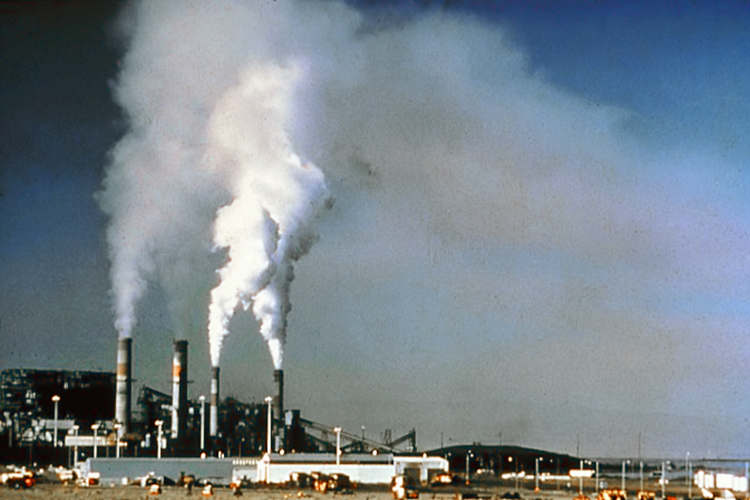
Before flue-gas desulfurization was installed, emissions from Four Corners Generating Station, New Mexico contained excessive amounts of sulfur dioxide.

At power plants, flue gas is often treated with a series of chemical processes and scrubbers, which remove pollutants. Electrostatic precipitators or fabric filters remove particulate matter and flue-gas desulfurization captures the sulfur dioxide produced by burning fossil fuels, particularly coal. Such scrubbing can lead to meaningful recovery of sulfur for further industrial use. Nitrogen oxides are treated either by modifications to the combustion process to prevent their formation, or by high temperature or catalytic reaction with ammonia or urea. In either case, the aim is to produce nitrogen gas, rather than nitrogen oxides. In the United States, there is a rapid deployment of technologies to remove mercury from flue gas—typically by absorption on sorbents or by capture in inert solids as part of the flue-gas desulfurization product.

Technologies based on regenerative capture by amines for the removal of CO_{2} from flue gas have been deployed to provide high purity CO_{2} gas to the food industry, and for enhanced oil recovery. They are now under active research as a method for CO_{2} capture for long-term storage as a means of greenhouse gas remediation, and have begun to be implemented in a limited way commercially (e.g. the Sleipner West field in the North Sea, operating since 1996).

There are a number of proven technologies for removing pollutants emitted from power plants that are now available. There is also much ongoing research into technologies that will remove even more air pollutants.

== Fossil fuels ==
Most fossil fuels are combusted with ambient air (as differentiated from combustion with pure oxygen). Since ambient air contains about 79 volume percent gaseous nitrogen (N_{2}), which is essentially non-combustible, the largest part of the flue gas from most fossil-fuel combustion is uncombusted nitrogen. Carbon dioxide (CO_{2}), the next largest part of flue gas, can be as much as 10−25 volume percent or more of the flue gas. This is closely followed in volume by water vapor (H_{2}O) created by the combustion of the hydrogen in the fuel with atmospheric oxygen. Much of the 'smoke' seen pouring from flue gas stacks is this water vapor, forming a cloud as it contacts cool air.

A typical flue gas from the combustion of fossil fuels contains very small amounts of nitrogen oxides (NO_{x}), sulfur dioxide (SO_{2}) and particulate matter. The nitrogen oxides are derived from the nitrogen in the ambient air, as well as from any nitrogen-containing compounds in the fossil fuel. The sulfur dioxide is derived from any sulfur-containing compounds in the fuels. The particulate matter is composed of very small particles of solid materials and very small liquid droplets which give flue gases their smoky appearance.

The steam generators in large power plants and the process furnaces in large refineries, petrochemical and chemical plants, and incinerators burn considerable amounts of fossil fuels and therefore emit large amounts of flue gas to the ambient atmosphere. The table below presents the total amounts of flue gas typically generated by the burning of fossil fuels such as natural gas, fuel oil and coal. The data were obtained by stoichiometric calculations.

The total amount of wet flue gas generated by coal combustion is only 10 percent higher than the flue gas generated by natural-gas combustion (the ratio for dry flue gas is higher).

=== Composition of flue-gas emissions from fossil-fuel combustion ===
Exhaust flue gas generated by combustion of fossil fuels (In SI metric units and in US customary units)
Combustion data	Fuel gas	Fuel oil	Coal
Fuel properties:			
Gross caloric value, MJ/m^{3}	43.01		
Gross heating value, Btu/scf	1,093		
Gross caloric value, MJ/kg		43.50	
Gross heating value, Btu/gal		150,000	
Gross caloric value, MJ/kg			25.92
Gross heating value, Btu/lb			11,150
Molecular weight	18		
Specific gravity		0.9626	
Gravity, °API		15.5	
Carbon/hydrogen ratio by weight		8.1	
weight % carbon			61.2
weight % hydrogen			4.3
weight % oxygen			7.4
weight % sulfur			3.9
weight % nitrogen			1.2
weight % ash			12.0
weight % moisture			10.0
Combustion air:			
Excess combustion air, %	12	15	20
Wet exhaust flue gas:			
Amount of wet exhaust gas, m^{3}/GJ of fuel	294.8	303.1	323.1
Amount of wet exhaust gas, scf/10^{6} Btu of fuel	11,600	11,930	12,714
CO_{2} in wet exhaust gas, volume %	8.8	12.4	13.7
O_{2} in wet exhaust gas, volume %	2.0	2.6	3.4
Molecular weight of wet exhaust gas	27.7	29.0	29.5
Dry exhaust flue gas:			
Amount of dry exhaust gas, m^{3}/GJ of fuel	241.6	269.3	293.6
Amount of dry exhaust gas, scf/10^{6} Btu of fuel	9,510	10,600	11,554
CO_{2} in dry exhaust gas, volume %	10.8	14.0	15.0
O_{2} in dry exhaust gas, volume %	2.5	2.9	3.7
Molecular weight of dry exhaust gas	29.9	30.4	30.7

m^{3} are standard cubic meters at 0 °C and 101.325 kPa, and scf is standard cubic feet at 60 °F and 14.696 psia.

== See also ==
- AP 42 Compilation of Air Pollutant Emission Factors
- Carbon capture and storage
- Emission standard
- Exhaust gas
- Flue gas stacks
- Flue gas to fuel
- Flue-gas desulfurization
- Integrated gasification combined cycle (often referred to as IGCC)
- Landfill gas
