= Pressure drop =

Difference in pressure between two points of a fluid

Pressure drop (often abbreviated as "dP" or "ΔP") is defined as the difference in total pressure between two points of a fluid carrying network. A pressure drop occurs when frictional forces, caused by the resistance to flow, act on a fluid as it flows through a conduit (such as a channel, pipe, or tube). This friction converts some of the fluid's hydraulic energy to thermal energy (i.e., internal energy). Since the thermal energy cannot be converted back to hydraulic energy, the fluid experiences a drop in pressure, as is required by conservation of energy.

The main determinants of resistance to fluid flow are fluid velocity through the pipe and fluid viscosity. Pressure drop increases proportionally to the frictional shear forces within the piping network. A piping network containing a high relative roughness rating as well as many pipe fittings and joints, tube convergence, divergence, turns, surface roughness, and other physical properties will affect the pressure drop. High flow velocities or high fluid viscosities result in a larger pressure drop across a pipe section, valve, or elbow joint. Low velocity will result in less (or no) pressure drop. The fluid may also be biphasic as in pneumatic conveying with a gas and a solid; in this case, the friction of the solid must also be taken into consideration for calculating the pressure drop.

== Applications ==
Fluid in a system will always flow from a region of higher pressure to a region of lower pressure, assuming it has a path to do so. All things being equal, a higher pressure drop will lead to a higher flow (except in cases of choked flow).

The pressure drop of a given system will determine the amount of energy needed to convey fluid through that system. For example, a larger pump could be required to move a set amount of water through smaller-diameter pipes (with higher velocity and thus higher pressure drop) as compared to a system with larger-diameter pipes (with lower velocity and thus lower pressure drop).

== Calculation of pressure drop ==
Pressure drop is related inversely to pipe diameter to the fifth power. For example, halving a pipe's diameter would increase the pressure drop by a factor of $2^5=32$ (e.g. from 2 psi to 64 psi), assuming no change in flow.

Pressure drop in piping is directly proportional to the length of the piping—for example, a pipe with twice the length will have twice the pressure drop, given the same flow rate. Piping fittings (such as elbow and tee joints) generally lead to greater pressure drop than straight pipe. As such, a number of correlations have been developed to calculate equivalent length of fittings.

Certain valves are provided with an associated flow coefficient, commonly known as C_{v} or K_{v}. The flow coefficient relates pressure drop, flow rate, and specific gravity for a given valve.

Many empirical calculations exist for calculation of pressure drop, including:

- Darcy–Weisbach equation, to calculate pressure drop in a pipe
- Hagen–Poiseuille equation

== See also ==
- ΔP
- head loss
