= Absorption (chemistry) =

Chemical process

Laboratory absorber. 1a): CO_{2} inlet; 1b): H_{2}O inlet; 2): outlet 3): absorption column; 4): packing.

Absorption is a physical or chemical phenomenon or a process in which atoms, molecules or ions enter the liquid or solid bulk phase of a material. This is a different process from adsorption, since molecules undergoing absorption are taken up by the volume, not by the surface (as in the case for adsorption).

A more common definition is that "Absorption is a chemical or physical phenomenon in which the molecules, atoms and ions of the substance getting absorbed enter into the bulk phase (gas, liquid or solid) of the material in which it is taken up."

A more general term is sorption, which covers absorption, adsorption, and ion exchange. Absorption is a condition in which something takes in another substance.

In many processes important in technology, chemical absorption is used in place of the physical process, e.g., absorption of carbon dioxide by sodium hydroxide – such acid-base processes do not follow the Nernst partition law (see: solubility).

For some examples of this effect, see liquid-liquid extraction. It is possible to extract a solute from one liquid phase to another without a chemical reaction. Examples of such solutes are noble gases and osmium tetroxide.

The process of absorption means that a substance captures and transforms energy. The absorbent distributes the material it captures throughout whole and adsorbent only distributes it through the surface.

The process of gas or liquid which penetrate into the body of adsorbent is commonly known as absorption.

IUPAC definition

absorption: 1) The process of one material (absorbate) being retained by another (absorbent); this may be the physical solution of a gas, liquid, or solid in a liquid, attachment of molecules of a gas, vapour, liquid, or dissolved substance to a solid surface by physical forces, etc. In spectrophotometry, absorption of light at characteristic wavelengths or bands of wavelengths is used to identify the chemical nature of molecules, atoms or ions and to measure the concentrations of these species. 2) A phenomenon in which radiation transfers to matter which it traverses some of or all its energy.

== Equation ==
If absorption is a physical process not accompanied by any other physical or chemical process, it usually follows the Nernst distribution law:

"the ratio of concentrations of some solute species in two bulk phases when it is equilibrium and in contact is constant for a given solute and bulk phases":

$$\frac{[x]_{1}}{[x]_{2}} = \text{constant} = K_{N(x,12)}$$

The value of constant K_{N} depends on temperature and is called partition coefficient. This equation is valid if concentrations are not too large and if the species "x" does not change its form in any of the two phases "1" or "2". If such molecule undergoes association or dissociation then this equation still describes the equilibrium between "x" in both phases, but only for the same form – concentrations of all remaining forms must be calculated by taking into account all the other equilibria.

In the case of gas absorption, one may calculate its concentration by using, e.g., the Ideal gas law, c = p/RT. In alternative fashion, one may use partial pressures instead of concentrations.

== Types of absorption ==
Absorption is a process that may be chemical (reactive) or physical (non-reactive).

=== Chemical absorption ===
Chemical absorption or reactive absorption is a chemical reaction between the absorbed and the absorbing substances. Sometimes it combines with physical absorption. This type of absorption depends upon the stoichiometry of the reaction and the concentration of its reactants. They may be carried out in different units, with a wide spectrum of phase flow types and interactions. In most cases, RA is carried out in plate or packed columns.

=== Physical absorption ===
==== Water in a solid ====
Hydrophilic solids, which include many solids of biological origin, can readily absorb water. Polar interactions between water and the molecules of the solid favor partition of the water into the solid, which can allow significant absorption of water vapor even in relatively low humidity.

===== Moisture regain =====
A fiber (or other hydrophilic material) that has been exposed to the atmosphere will usually contain some water even if it feels dry. The water can be driven off by heating in an oven, leading to a measurable decrease in weight, which will gradually be regained if the fiber is returned to a 'normal' atmosphere. This effect is crucial in the textile industry – where the proportion of a material's weight made up by water is called the moisture regain.

== See also ==
- Lamm-Honigmann process
