= Fog nozzle =

Type of firefighting hose

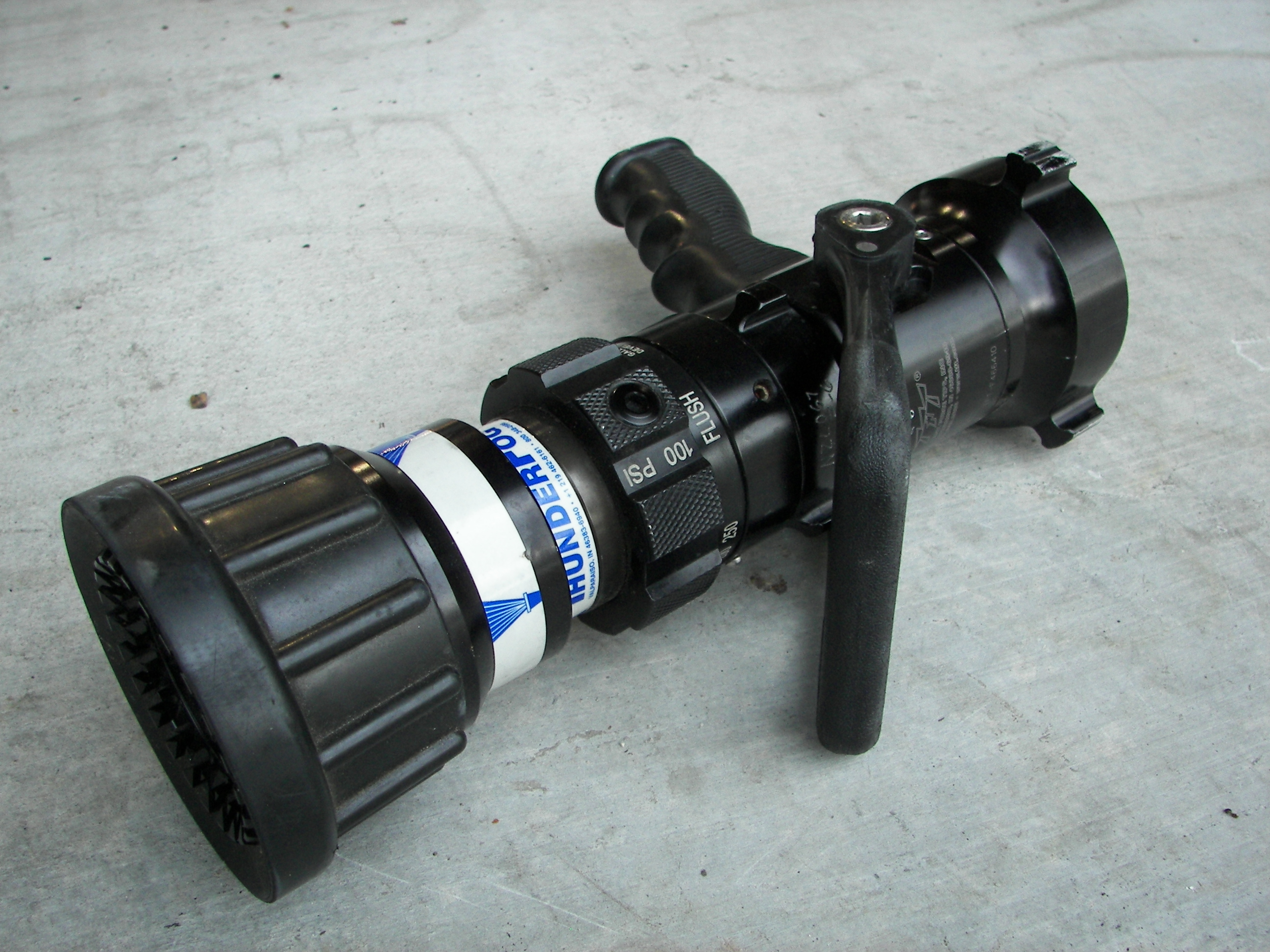
A fog nozzle

A fog nozzle is a firefighting hose spray nozzle that breaks its stream into small droplets. By doing so, its stream achieves a greater surface area, and thus a greater rate of heat absorption, which, when compared to that of a smoothbore nozzle, speeds its transformation into the steam that smothers the fire by displacing its oxygen. Specially designed fog nozzles (with no stream adjustment) have been certified by Underwriters Laboratories (UL) for use on Class B & C hazards.

== Roles ==
Fog nozzles play an important part in firefighting tactics due to their versatility. The wide variety of fog nozzle manufacturers allows them to accommodate different sizes of fire hose—most often attack hand line—and streams and are capable in both fire protection and attack. With regard to flow rate, it is imperative to be sure that each fog nozzle be able to handle the flow rate of its water supply because the master stream devices to which they are sometimes attached can expel up to 2,000 US gallons (7.6 m^{3}) per minute. Nevertheless, as with almost all fog nozzles, those on master stream devices come with either automatic or manual spray pattern and stream adjustments. However, one significant disadvantage of fog nozzles is that the ratio of surface area to volume of the compressed air foam (CAF) bubbles (which are formed by mixing air into a solution of water and foaming agents at the pump) exceeds that of fog nozzles' water droplets; therefore, the mechanical deflection in the nozzles themselves causes a loss of bubble structure, thereby reducing the CAF's ability to absorb heat. Despite this drawback, provided an appropriate nozzle pressure and water supply, fog nozzles are effective for any ground fire situation.

== Variations ==
Fog nozzles come in many in different styles and sizes, but there are three types which encompass most: automatic, selectable, and manually adjustable. All contain an adjustable baffle that, like a thumb placed on the end of a garden hose, keeps their flow rates and stream reaches steady and finely adjustable despite variations in water pressure at the nozzle. To adjust the flow, the first two types use a control handle, or 'bale' located at the top of nozzle; however, selectable nozzles have a fixed set of flow rates (e.g., 60, 95, and 125 GPM (gallons per min)) that are chosen with a ring or bezel located at their tips. Selectable nozzles will only flow if the pump pressure exceeds the nozzle pressure. Moreover, the selectable nozzle will change its nozzle pressure and reach as the handle is moved, but the automatic nozzle will automatically re-adjust its opening as the firefighter adjusts its flow rate in order to maintain the correct pressure.

== Pattern ==
All styles of fog nozzles have a spray pattern adjustment. These nozzles can produce three different types of streams; the straight stream for long reach, the narrow-angle cone for advancing an attack line into a structure or fire room, and the wide-angle cone for protection and ventilation.

== Images ==
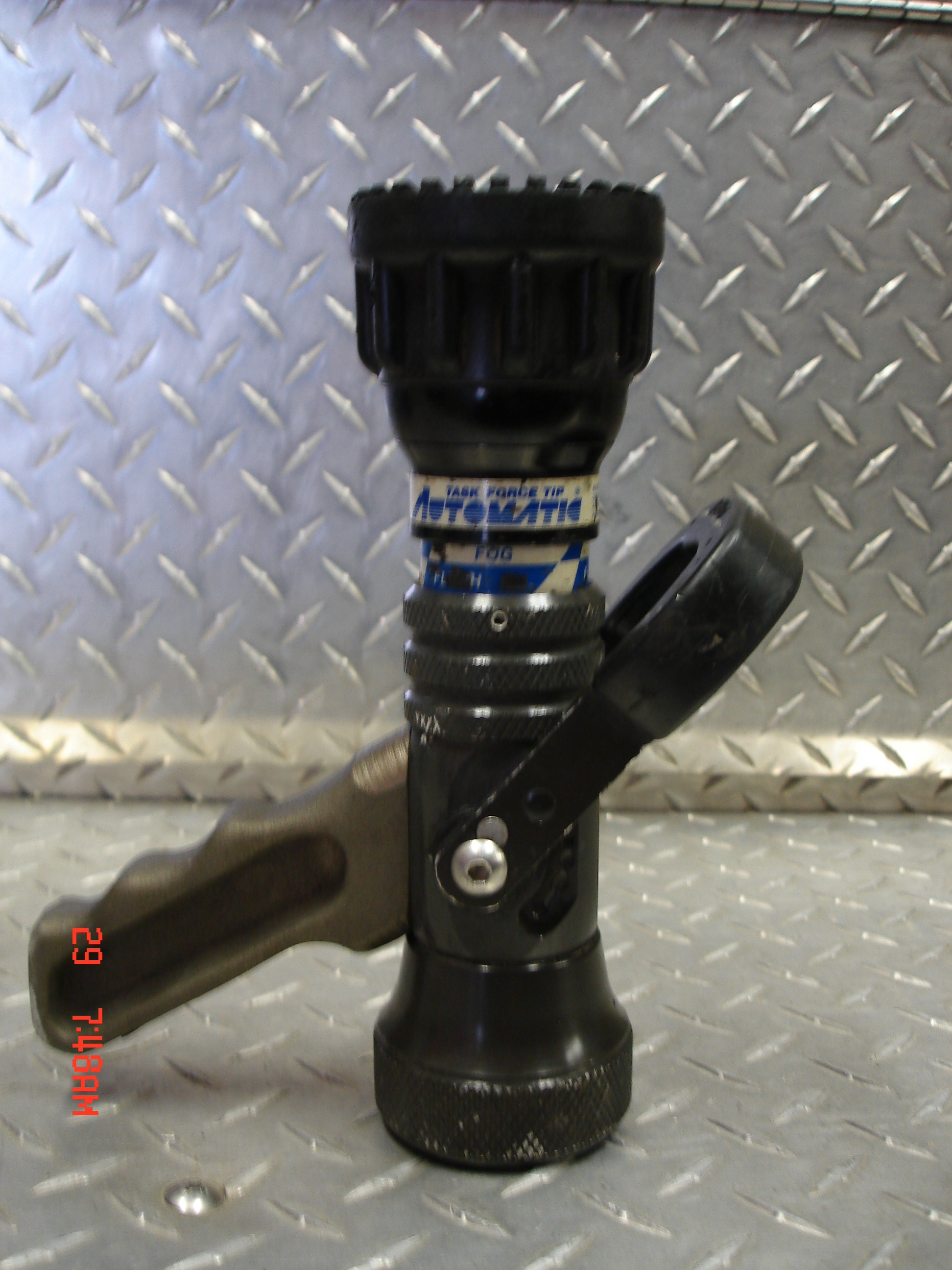
Automatic 1½″ fog nozzle

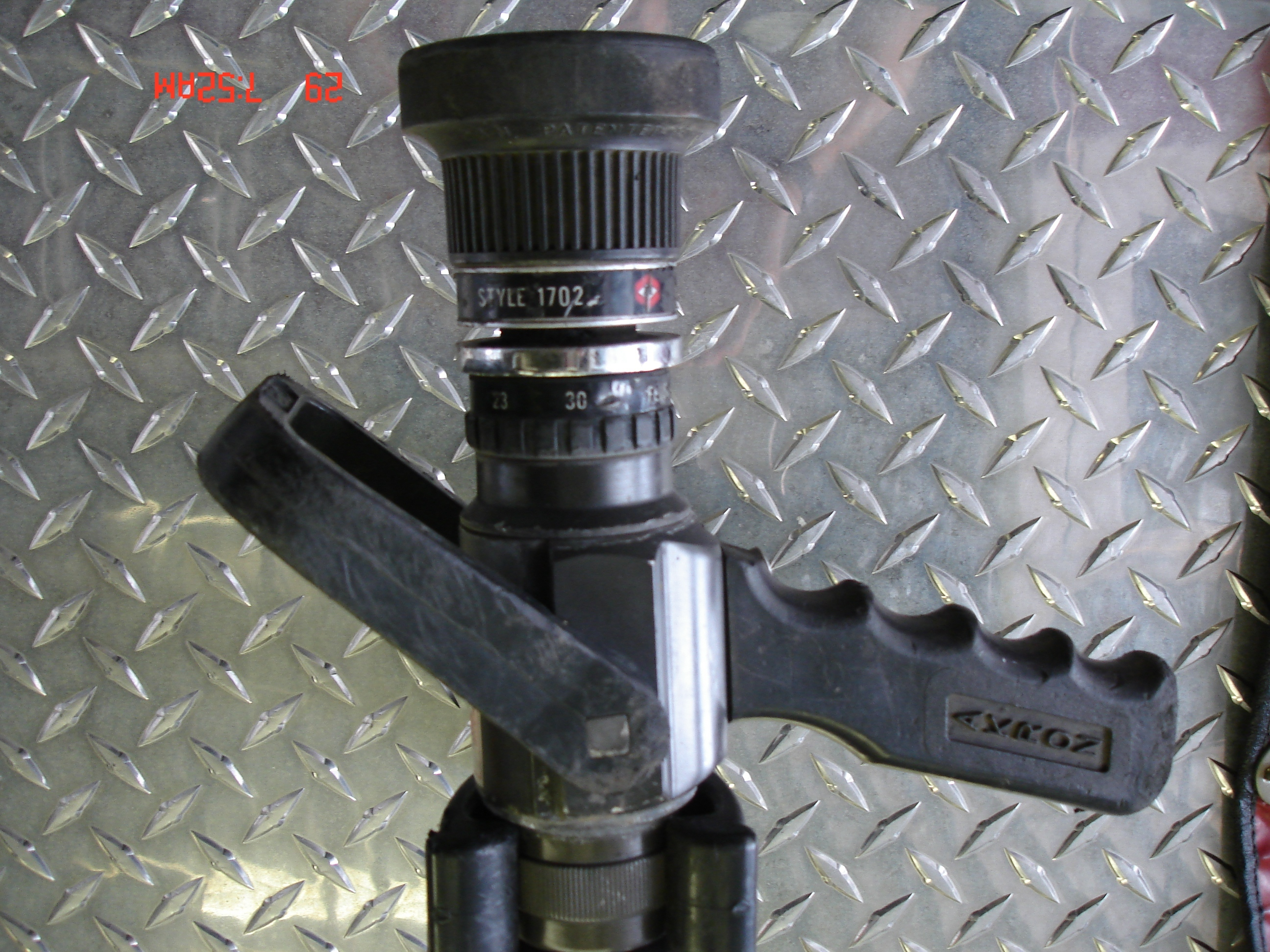
Manually adjustable 1½″ fog nozzle

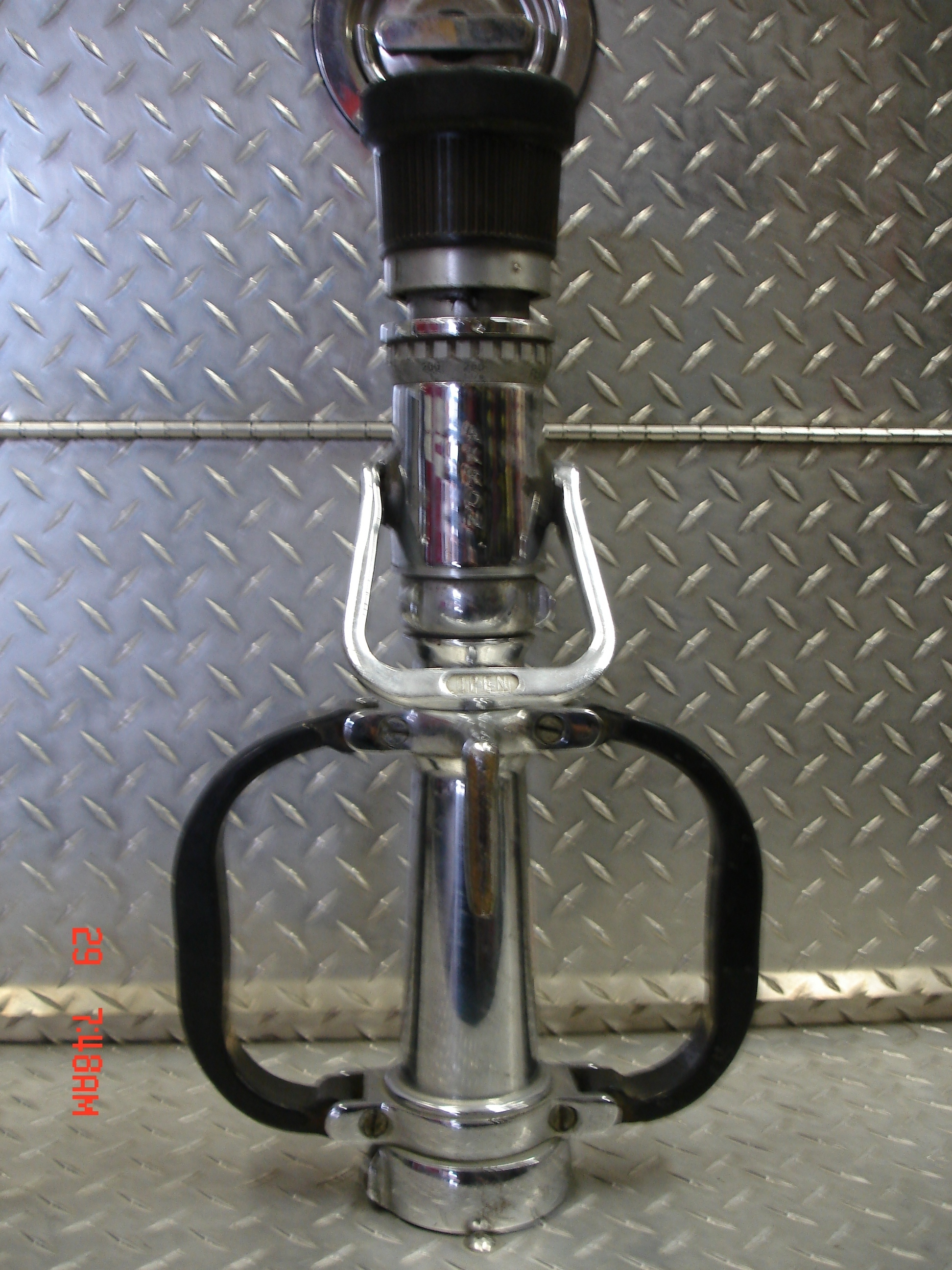
Manually adjustable 2½″ fog nozzle

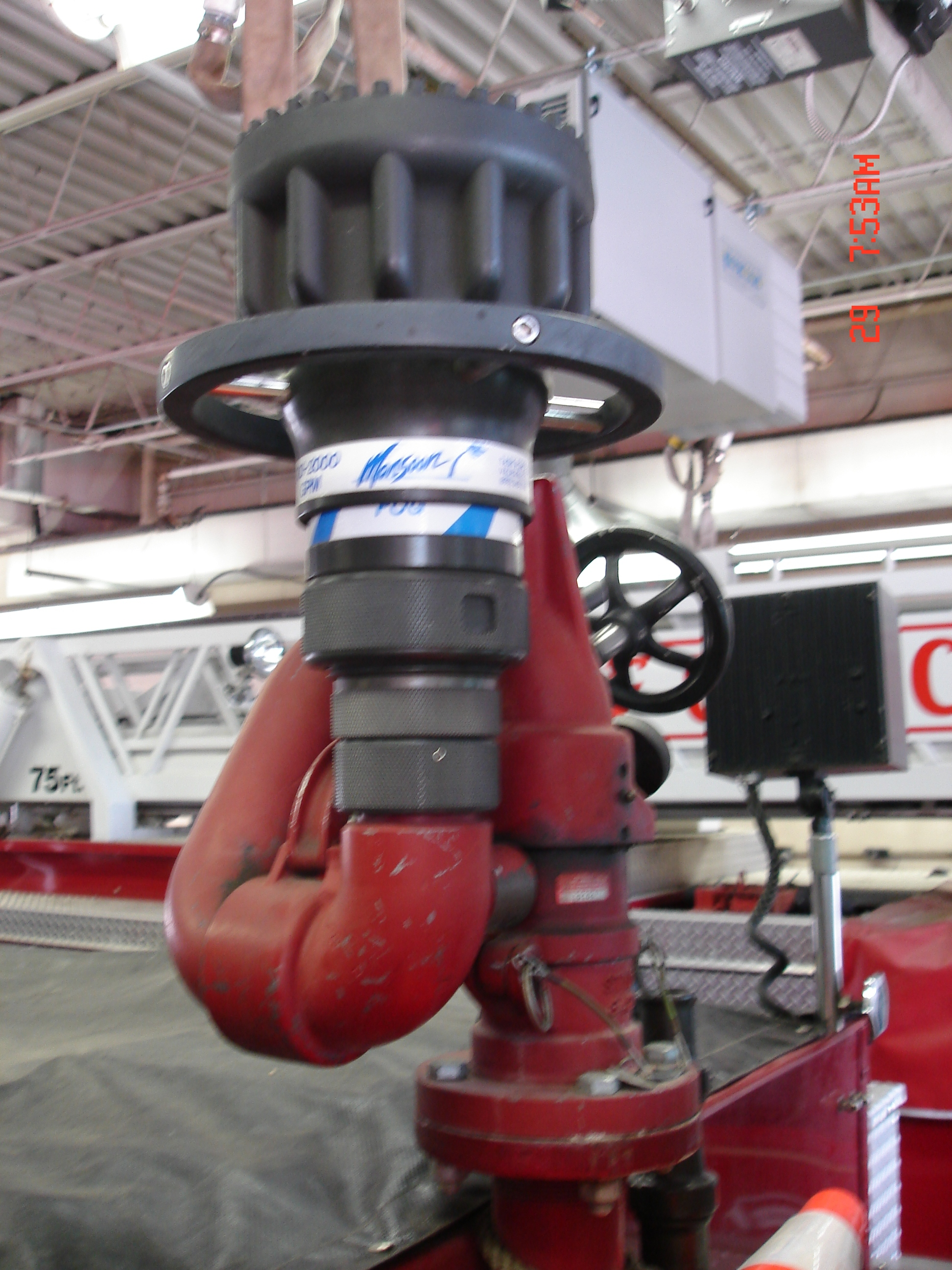
Automatic master stream fog nozzle

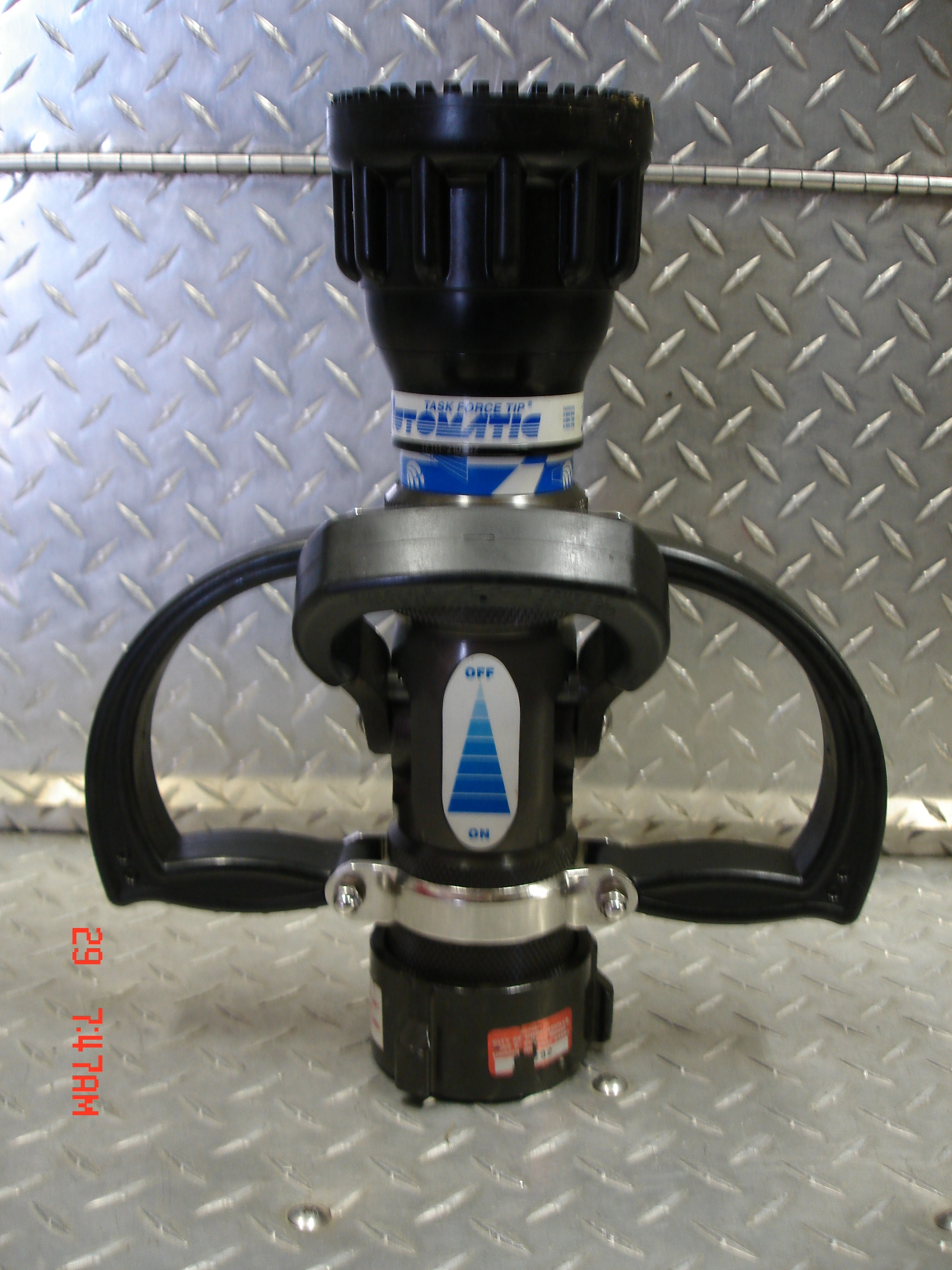
Automatic 2½″ fog nozzle

== See also ==
- Impulse Fire Extinguishing System
- Spray characteristics
- Spray nozzle
