= Ceramic spray nozzle =

A ceramic spray nozzle is a ceramic spray nozzle designed to control the flow rate, spray pattern, and atomization of liquids or slurries. It is manufactured from ceramic materials such as alumina (aluminum oxide), zirconia (zirconium dioxide), silicon nitride, silicon carbide, or boron carbide. Ceramic spray nozzles are used in applications that require high resistance to abrasion, corrosion, and thermal stress, including agriculture, industrial spraying, slurry handling, and high-temperature processes.

== History ==
The development of ceramic spray nozzles is closely linked to advances in agricultural spraying and industrial fluid-handling technologies in the mid-20th century. Prior to the introduction of ceramic nozzles, spray nozzles were typically manufactured from brass, steel, or other metals, which were prone to rapid wear when used with abrasive suspensions, mineral-based pesticides, or slurry fluids. As nozzle orifices enlarged due to erosion, flow rates increased and spray uniformity deteriorated, leading to reduced application accuracy and higher material consumption.

The first documented commercial use of ceramic spray nozzle technology dates to 1961, when the Japanese manufacturer H. Ikeuchi & Co., Ltd. developed spray nozzles incorporating ceramic orifice tips. This innovation was introduced to address severe wear problems encountered in agricultural spraying, particularly with copper-based and particulate-laden formulations. The ceramic-tipped design demonstrated significantly improved abrasion resistance and dimensional stability compared with conventional metal nozzles, allowing spray performance to remain consistent over longer service periods.

Following their initial adoption in agriculture, ceramic spray nozzles were gradually introduced into industrial applications during the 1970s and 1980s, including chemical processing, surface treatment, slurry transport, and abrasive spraying. By the late 20th century, ceramic spray nozzles had become established as reference components for wear resistance and service life in demanding environments. Ongoing research in tribology and fluid dynamics further refined nozzle geometries to reduce erosion rates and optimize atomization characteristics. In the early 21st century, the emergence of ceramic additive manufacturing and hybrid ceramic–polymer composites introduced new design possibilities allowing more complex internal flow paths and alternative material solutions while retaining many of the durability advantages pioneered by early ceramic nozzle designs.

== Applications ==
=== Agriculture ===
Ceramic spray nozzles are widely used in agricultural pesticide, herbicide, and fertilizer application. Their resistance to abrasive additives and solid suspensions helps maintain consistent flow rates and spray patterns, improving application accuracy and reducing spray drift.

=== Industrial and abrasive spraying ===
In industrial processes involving abrasive slurries, particulate-laden fluids, or sandblasting, ceramic nozzles provide significantly longer service life than steel or other metallic nozzles.

=== High-temperature and metallurgical processes ===
Ceramic spray nozzles are used in molten metal atomization, thermal spraying, spray cooling, and combustion systems due to their ability to withstand high temperatures and chemically aggressive environments.

=== Experimental and field studies on Spray performance and field wear ===
Experimental and field-based studies indicate that the spray performance of ceramic nozzles is governed Experimental and field-based studies indicate that the spray performance of ceramic nozzles is governed primarily by nozzle geometry and operating conditions, while long-term durability is influenced by wear during use. Laboratory research published in the Revista Brasileira de Engenharia Agrícola e Ambiental showed that nozzle type, operating pressure, spacing, and spray bar height significantly affect spray distribution and droplet size, with higher pressures generally producing finer droplets and increased drift potential.

Field evaluations reported in Engenharia Agrícola demonstrated that prolonged agricultural use of ceramic spray nozzles leads to increased flow rates and changes in droplet population characteristics, including greater variability and a higher proportion of droplets smaller than 100 μm, despite limited changes in droplet size classification.

Although ceramic nozzles are widely regarded as benchmarks for wear resistance and dimensional stability, recent materials research has explored polymer composites incorporating ceramic fillers as potential alternatives. A 2024 study in Polymers showed that polyoxymethylene composites reinforced with silicon carbide, a ceramic material, exhibited significantly improved mechanical strength and reduced hydro-abrasive wear compared with unfilled polymers, while maintaining good chemical resistance to pesticides.

== Manufacturing and materials ==
=== Manufacturing ===
Traditional manufacturing of ceramic spray nozzles involves powder processing techniques such as pressing, green machining, and high-temperature sintering. Precision grinding and polishing of the nozzle orifice are often required to achieve tight dimensional tolerances and smooth internal surfaces. Recent advances in ceramic additive manufacturing, including stereolithography-based slurry printing and binder jetting followed by sintering, have enabled the fabrication of complex nozzle geometries with optimized internal flow channels. These methods provide increased design flexibility and faster prototyping compared with conventional manufacturing approaches.

=== Materials ===
==== Alumina (aluminum oxide) ====
Alumina is the most commonly used ceramic material for spray nozzles due to its high hardness, chemical inertness, and relatively low manufacturing cost. Alumina nozzles are widely used in agricultural spraying and general industrial applications where moderate abrasion resistance is required.

==== Zirconia (zirconium dioxide) ====
Zirconia ceramics exhibit higher fracture toughness than alumina as a result of transformation-toughening mechanisms. This increased toughness improves resistance to crack propagation and impact damage, making zirconia suitable for highly abrasive and high-velocity spray environments as well as elevated temperatures.

==== Silicon nitride ====
Silicon nitride combines high mechanical strength with excellent thermal shock resistance and fracture toughness. These properties make it suitable for demanding applications such as combustion systems, thermal spraying, and high-temperature industrial processes.

==== Silicon carbide and boron carbide ====
Silicon carbide and boron carbide are among the hardest engineering ceramics available and exhibit exceptional resistance to abrasive wear and erosion. They are commonly used in slurry spraying, sandblasting, and other severe operating conditions, although their higher cost and brittleness limit their use to specialized applications.

=== Wear and erosion behavior ===
Erosive wear caused by solid particle impact is the dominant degradation mechanism for spray nozzles operating in abrasive environments. The erosion resistance of ceramic nozzles depends on material properties such as hardness, fracture toughness, grain size, and porosity. Alumina typically fails by brittle fracture and grain pull-out, while zirconia and silicon carbide exhibit lower steady-state erosion rates under similar conditions. Nozzle geometry also influences erosion behavior, as orifice diameter, inlet shape, and length-to-diameter ratio affect flow velocity and particle impingement angles.

== Limitations ==
Ceramic spray nozzles are inherently brittle and may fail under mechanical shock or improper installation. Protective housings and careful handling are often required to reduce the risk of fracture. Higher initial cost also limit their use to applications.
