= IFEX =

IFEX may refer to:

- Ifosfamide, drug marketed as Mitoxana or Ifex
- Impulse Fire Extinguishing System
- International Freedom of Expression Exchange
