= Rotary atomizer =

Rotary atomizers use a high-speed rotating disk, cup or wheel to discharge liquid at high speed to the perimeter, forming a hollow cone spray. The rotational speed controls the drop size. Spray drying and spray painting are the most important and common uses of this technology.

Many industries need to convert a large mass of liquid into a dispersion of small (micron-size) droplets (generate a spray). Some examples of this need are evaporative cooling, meteorology, printing, medical applications, spray combustion, coating, and drying. Various devices exist to generate sprays, such as atomizers, sprayers, nozzles, and applicators. Sprays are typically generated by producing a high speed difference between the phase of gases and the liquid to be atomized. These devices achieve this atomization by releasing the liquid at very high speed into the unagitated air. The liquid can also be atomized by using a reverse process, instead of accelerating the liquid, gas can be accelerated to achieve a relatively higher speed than the liquid. The devices using this method to achieve atomization are called as airblast, air-assist, or popularly twin-fluid atomizers. In a rotary atomizer, the rotating cup or disc forces the liquid to come out at a very high speed through its rim.

The rotary, pressure-swirl or twin-fluid atomizers are the most common methods for spray generation. For special applications, alternative atomizer types exist such as the electrostatic atomizer in which electrical pressure is used to drive the atomization, and the ultrasonic atomizing device in which the liquid is passed through a transducer vibrating at ultrasonic frequencies to generate shorter wavelengths which convert the fluid into smaller droplets. Since the flow rate of liquid is low in both of these devices, their applications are limited.

== Working principle ==
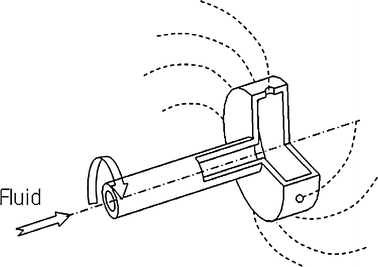
Concept of Rotary Atomization

Rotary atomizers work on the principle of centrifugal energy; this energy is used to produce a high relative speed between the fluid and air which is essential for atomization. A rotary atomizer comprises a rotating surface. This surface can be in the form of a flat or a vaned disc, a cup, or a slotted wheel. A basic rotary atomizer is displayed in the figure.

The liquid first flows radially outwards in the disc and is then released from the disc's outer limits at a relatively very high speed. The atomization relies on the liquid's flow rate and the disc's rotational speed. The fluid is released from the disc's outer limits as uniform-sized droplets at low flow rates. At a comparatively high flow rate, ligaments are generated along the disc's outer limits which later on break into smaller droplets. When the flow rate is further increased, the ligaments become unable to fit in with the liquid flow, and hence a fine sheet of liquid is produced which expands past the disc's rim. This sheet, later on, disintegrates into ligaments and finally, drops are formed. The transition from ligament to sheet formation can be delayed by ragging the disc's edges. Rotary atomizers belong to the mechanical atomizers; hence, neither a high-pressure liquid nor a pressurized gas is required for atomization. The energy required for atomization is transferred directly from the atomizer body to the liquid. This gives us an advantage that the energy required for atomizing the liquid is directly supplied mechanically and energetically. The complicated and costly production of compressed gas, for example, compressed air, is no longer necessary. It is sufficient to feed the liquid to be atomized to the atomizer under low pressure. Sometimes a low hydrostatic pressure is adequate.

=== Working formulae ===
The spray generated by a device like a rotary atomizer can be viewed as liquid droplets submerged in a continuous phase of gases. The size of droplet formed by atomizer depends on various properties of the fluid (both liquid and gaseous fluid) such as density, viscosity and surface tension between fluids. Generally, small gas turbines operate under high rotational speed of more than 100,000 rpm. Even small-sized atomizer of 10 cm diameter revolving at 30,000 rpm can impart an acceleration of 490, 000 m/s^{2} (which is fifty thousand times of gravity) on the liquid fuel. Eventually, such fuel atomizers create very tiny droplets. The rotary atomizer in which liquid is revolving along with it at the rate of ω and has radial channels at nominal radius R=(R_{1}+R_{2})/2 in the edge from which high-speed liquid interacts with gas to form droplets.

Considering the nominal radius of the channel and thus of mass of liquid inside channel equal to R, the liquid inside channel will experience the centrifugal acceleration of Rω^{2}, which causes the liquid to form a thin layer of thickness t on both walls of the channel. At very high acceleration thickness of the liquid layer (film) is very small in order μm. The shape of the channel also decides the effectiveness of atomization and the size of droplets. That is one aspect of determining the size of the droplet is the velocity of liquid in the channel (v=Rω).

So, we have four dimensionless terms derived from the above properties which determine the performance of atomization.

1. Liquid–gas density ratio

r = [ρ_{L} / ρ_{G}] where ρ_{L} and ρ_{G} are densities of liquid and gas respectively

2. Viscosity ratio

m = [μ_{L} / μ_{G}] where, μ_{L} and μ_{G} are viscosities of liquid and gas respectively

3. Weber number

We_{t} = [ρ_{G} V_{c}^{2} t/σ_{s}] where σ_{s} is surface tension between liquid and gas contact surface. It is the ratio of the force applied by the gas on the liquid layer to the surface tension force acting on liquid.

4. Ohnesorge number

Oh_{t}= [μ_{L} / (ρ_{L} σ_{s} t) ^{1/2}]

It is the ratio of viscous force inside the layer to the surface tension force acting on liquid. Altogether, all these terms describe three main phenomena of atomization viz., inertia, viscous diffusion and surface tension. For practical fuel atomizer, Ohnesorge number is limited to Oh_{t}<<1 and the size of the droplet are not much affected by Ohnesorge number. So, viscous effects can be neglected. But Weber number can't be neglected since surface tension and inertia are the major phenomena of the atomization process.

For small values of We, surface tension is dominant, and this force pulls the liquid towards the wall of the channel, making a single column that eventually breaks after meeting air resulting in comparatively larger droplets. This is known as the subcritical breakup of liquid. Whereas, for the supercritical breakup of liquid (more significant values of We), force applied by gas is dominant for breaking of liquid which results in fine small size of droplets.

== Features ==
- Because of the breakup energy which the wheel's high-speed supplies in liquid feed systems, they can run at relatively low pressure. The atomizer drive gives the high speed to the wheel.
- Clogging can be a problem for spray nozzle systems, whereas rotary atomizers can work in such situations.
- A rotary atomizer can manage large amounts of abrasive and non-abrasive feeds.
- A rotary atomizer can take very viscous liquids.
- A rotary atomizer is flexible according to particle size. It can be modified from 5 μ to 150 μ by changing the wheel speed.
- A rotary atomizer can give different powder characteristics and bulk density by equipping with different wheel designs.
- A rotary atomizer can be fitted with a wide variety of wheels with various designs and sizes for abrasive and non-abrasive feeds.

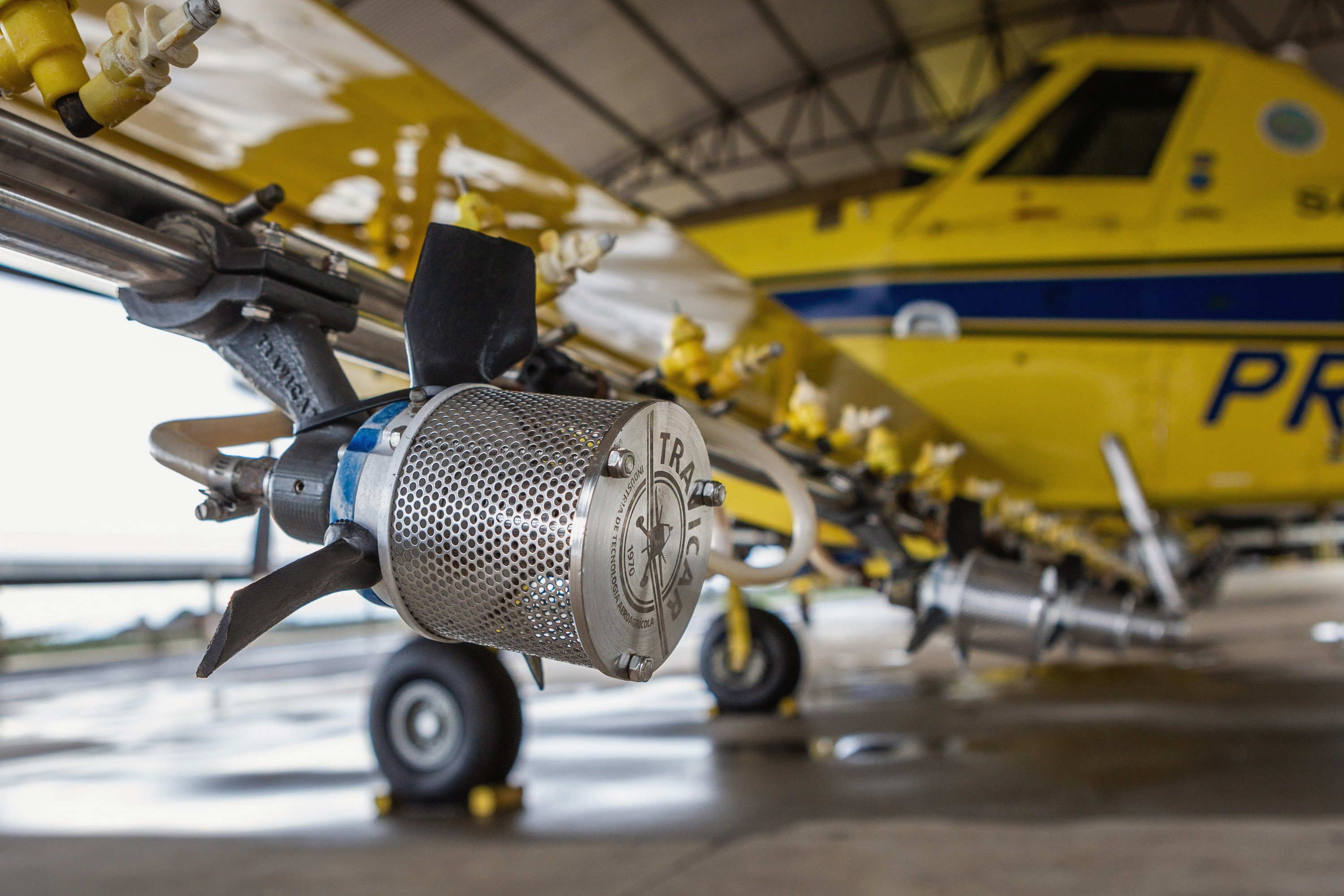
A rotary atomizer as used in aerial crop spraying

== Applications ==
=== Industrial finishing ===
Rotary atomizer technology is found often on paint lines in the industrial finishing industry. A rotary atomizer is mounted to a paint robot or a reciprocator. Often call a rotary bell atomizer, this paint applicator is often paired with electrostatic technology in order to maximize transfer efficiency of the paint. Rotary atomizers spin at extremely high speeds to break up the paint into fine, even particle sizes. Leading to a very high quality, consistent finish. This technology is used to paint a variety of industries including automotive, aerospace, aluminum extrusion, agricultural equipment, cosmetics, household cookware, electronics and more.
