= Patternation =

Patternation is the specialized technical art of performing quantitative measurements of specific properties of particles within a spray and visualizing the patterns of this specific property within the spray. In order to understand patternation, we need to consider the role sprays play in our daily lives.

== Uses of sprays ==
Sprays have a number of uses. In its natural form, sprays appear in waterfall mists, rains and ocean sprays, according to Arthur Lefebvre, in his book, Atomization and Sprays.

Within the household sphere, sprays are used in showers, garden hoses, spray paint cans, hair spray, deodorant sprays and more. Industrial uses of sprays include spray drying, coating, washing, and irrigating.

Sprays are also used in many internal combustion engines to directly disperse the fuel into the combustion chamber and mix it with air so that either spontaneously ignite under high pressure and temperatures or they can be ignited using spark plugs.

== Understanding the importance of spray patternation ==
Patternation of sprays is important in a variety of applications including IC engines, turbines, spray coating, spray drying, agriculture, and consumer products. For example, asymmetries in patternation directly affect surface finish quality during painting and poor product quality during spray drying. Similarly, in gas turbines, variation in the spray pattern leads to fuel lean and fuel rich pockets resulting in excessive turbine wear and increased particulate emission.

For metered-dose inhalers, the pattern of the spray is very important to ensure that the maximum amount of the drug goes through the throat passageways into the lungs. In agricultural nozzles the pattern of the spray is important so as to optimize the delivery of pesticides and fertilizers to the plants. Spray drying requires that the droplet sizes be closely controlled. In general, increasing the total drop surface area within the dryer will lead to higher evaporation rates and greater efficiency for the process. Similarly, pharmaceutical tablets owe their thin film surface coating to an atomizer produced spray that needs to be perfect. The coating not only masks taste but also performs key functions such as sealing the tablet from moisture to improve shelf life, controlling drug release rates to get slow and extended release tablets.

== How scientists study spray patterns ==
Spray patterns are studied using diagnostic tools known as patternators. A patternator quantifies the spatial location of the drops emitted from a sprayer and visualizes the patterns of sprays. There are different types of patternators, mechanical and optical.

== Mechanical patternators ==
Mechanical patternators are called intrusive patternators.

They typically collect the mass flux of liquid in small containers or spray color onto papers to look at the pattern that are then weighed to provide local information. Mechanical patternators are not very accurate and suffer from a number of systematic and random errors In addition, they interfere with the spray pattern itself, and are generally not suitable for obtaining accurate data on spray patterns.

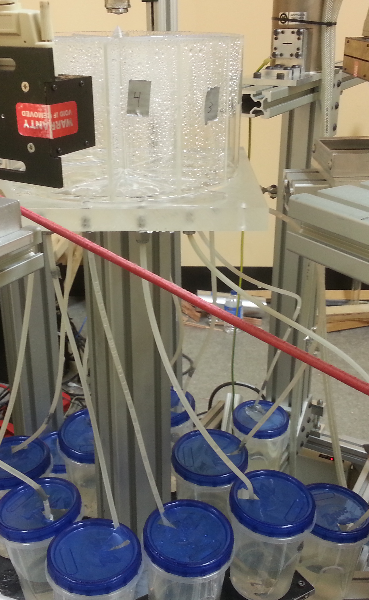
Photograph showing mechanical patternation being performed on a spray nozzle (Courtesy En’Urga Inc.)

== Optical patternators ==
To avoid the errors in mechanical patternation, it is generally accepted that the patternation technique has to be optical.

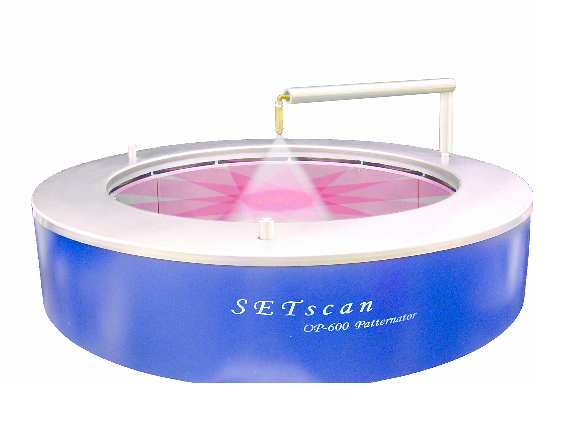
Picture of an Optical Patternator based on Laser Extinction Tomography.

Optical patternators provide the distribution of drop surface areas rather than the mass flux. In many instances, this is advantageous as all local transfer phenomena, such as mass; momentum; energy and species are directly proportional to the surface area density of the droplets in the spray. There are three principal types of optical patternators: (a) those that use laser sheets, (b)those that use planar liquid laser induced fluorescence and (c) those that use laser extinction tomography.

=== Using a laser sheet ===
The first is based on using a laser sheet to illuminate a plane orthogonal to the spray direction or along the spray direction and capturing the image of the scattered light using an off-axis camera. It is assumed that the scattered intensity is proportional to the local drop surface area density.

=== Using planar liquid laser induced fluorescence ===
A second type of patternators are based on using planar liquid laser induced fluorescence. The liquid is mixed with some fluorescent material and illuminated with a high power laser sheet. The resulting fluorescence image is captured and analyzed to provide the local mass concentrations within the spray.

Both these methods have significant errors due to laser extinction, signal attenuation, and secondary emission

=== Using laser extinction tomography ===
The third set of optical patternators is based on laser extinction or laser extinction tomography.

The laser extinction tomography system provides the local drop surface area density (number of drops per unit volume at a specific location multiplied by the surface area of the drops). This quantity is directly proportional to the evaporation of the drops and is very important in applications involving combustion and spray drying.

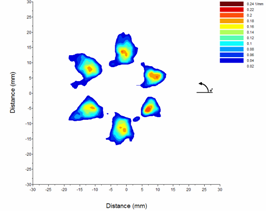

The picture shows results from testing a Gasoline Direct Injector (GDI) using an optical patternator that is based on extinction tomography. This optical patternator can be used to analyze highly dense sprays.
