= Harvey L. Berger =

American scientist (1938–2007)

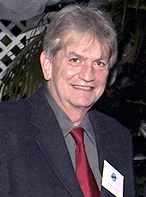
- Born: August 30, 1938; Brooklyn, NY
- Died: August 2007
- Known for: Inventor, Ultrasonic Nozzle

Harvey Berger (August 30, 1938 – August 2007) was a scientist and inventor. He invented the modern commercial ultrasonic nozzle, which in its application has brought many benefits to the fields of research, combustion and manufacturing. Berger founded Sono-Tek Corporation based on this technology and while working at the company he made contributions to the fields of combustion, semiconductor manufacturing, electronic printed circuit board manufacturing, drug eluting stents and spray drying. Berger died in August 2007 after a struggle with liver cancer. He was survived by his wife Donna and by his three children, Michael, Robyn and Barbara.

== Early life and education ==
Harvey Berger was born on August 30, 1938, in Brooklyn, New York. His parents were Regina Landow and Bernard Berger, a local pharmacist. His family later moved into the Hudson Valley region in mid-state New York.

Berger earned a degree in Nuclear physics from Rensselaer Polytechnic Institute in 1960. During the 1960s he did work for General Electric while developing his doctoral thesis entitled "Effects of Recoilless Emission on Gamma-Gamma Angular Correlation in Sn-199" for which was awarded his PhD in Physics from RPI in June 1969.

== Career ==
While working at GE on various projects related to his doctoral thesis and the Mössbauer effect, Berger also did research on polymer chemistry and Cherenkov radiation. He later worked at Espey Manufacturing and Electronics Corporation where he began to work deeply in the field airflow, thermal dynamics, and combustion.

=== Ultrasonic Atomization ===
Berger based his work on ultrasonic atomization first from the work of John William Strutt, 3rd Baron Rayleigh and his capillary waves in liquid as they relate to the frequency of vibration, imposed and on that of Robert J. Lang whose published experiments involved atomizing melted wax and cooling and collecting the resultant small beads which he could measure. Lang's work showed a direct correlation between the sizes and the frequency of the vibrations that produced them.

In 1973 and 1974 Berger was working to counter the effects of the 1973 oil crisis, believing that the advantages of ultrasonic spray would make heating a building more efficient; an idea for which he later file and received one of his many US Patents on a design of an ultrasonic nozzle. U.S. patent 3,861,852 By the time Berger and his team had worked out a viable commercial design, the woes of oil crisis had passed and he set out to find the right applications for his new technology.

In addition to the many patents Berger was granted for his work U.S. patent 4,153,201, U.S. patent 4,301,968, et al., he was published and cited in many technical journals such as his introduction of the technology to The International Conference on Liquid Atomization and Spray Systems

Berger "wrote the book" on the subject matter and published Ultrasonic Liquid Atomization, Theory and Application in 1998.

Being the father of the application of the technology, Harvey Berger was frequently called to speak on the matter and write publications regarding its benefits in certain applications, such as medical applications and more specifically the coating of drug-eluting stents.
