= Paint robot =

Industrial robot used in automotive paint applications

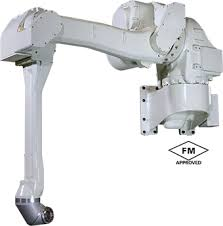
KJ 314

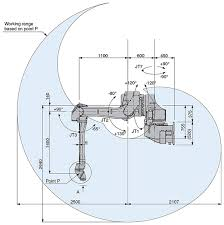
KJ 314 work envelope

Industrial paint robots have been used for decades in automotive paint applications.

Early paint robots were hydraulic versions, which are still in use today but are of inferior quality and safety to the latest electronic offerings. The newest robots are accurate and deliver results with uniform film builds and exact thicknesses.

Originally, industrial paint robots were large and expensive, but robot prices have come down to the point that general industry can now afford the same level of automation used by the large automotive manufacturers.

The selection of modern paint robot varies much more in size and payload to allow many configurations for painting items of all sizes.

Painting robots generally have five or six axis motion, three for the base motions and up to three for applicator orientation. These robots can be used in any explosion hazard Class 1 Division 1 environment.

Industrial paint robots are designed to help standardize the distance and path the automatic sprayer takes, thus eliminating the risk of human error caused by manual spraying. Paint robots are often paired with other automatic painting equipment to maximize the efficiency and consistency of the paint finish. Rotational Bell atomizers, other automatic electrostatic or automatic conventional sprayers are mounted on the robot to provide the highest quality finish. Automatic mixing equipment will usually supply the sprayers with paint. This equipment is designed to regulate pressure and flow, which are extremely important in providing consistent paint finish. Varying levels of automatic mixing equipment can also provide features that cut down on paint waste, and energy costs.

== History ==
The worlds first painting robot was developed at Trallfa, a wheelbarrow factory in Bryne, Norway. The development started in 1964 to aid in the painting of the wheelbarrows and to reduce human interaction with toxic paint chemicals. In 1966 the robot was recruited for production in the factory painting the trolleys and wheelbarrows. By 1969 the robot was commercialized as its own product. The first robot, TR2000, was delivered to Swedish Gustavsberg Porcelain for enamelling bath tubs.

Painting robots have been around since at least 1985. They were first introduced in the automative industry, including at General Motors' plant in Michigan.

Industrial robots, including painting ones, were created to keep people out of "dangerous" jobs as well as increase productivity. Since their creation, robots have been working side by side with people in manufacturing companies.

In recent years, the painting robot has evolved past industrial use. Many inventors have taken on the idea of creating robots that can create works of art, rather than paint in just a solid color. Besides making them more creative, others have looked for ways to make the robots affordable and accessible for commercial use in places such as interior wall painting.

== Uses ==
=== Automotive industry ===
Painting robots are used by vehicle manufacturers to do detailing work on their cars in a consistent and systematic way. Some of these robots are designed with a robotic arm that moves vertically and horizontally, to apply paint on all parts of the car. A patent granted in 1985 to the Mazda Motor Corporation also includes a door handler (a small mechanical hand) that can open and close doors on a vehicle and paint the interior.

Robots are used to paint all different sized automotive parts because they can help provide consistent finish from one part to another. They are used for large exterior parts like doors, hoods, wheels, or bumpers, and also used on small interior components like knobs, consoles and glove boxes.

=== Aerospace and defense ===
Finish is also extremely important in the aerospace and defense industry. These parts require very precise specifications for safety and performance reasons. Coatings can provide erosion resistance, anti-static dissipation, and even radar evading stealth. For this reason, consistent finish on all parts is vital to ensure continuity throughout.

=== Aluminum extrusions & panels ===
Aluminum extrusion can be found in building panels, metal door and window frames, and structural extrusions that are used in the commercial building industry for protecting buildings and increase aesthetic appeal. Many panel and extrusion manufacturers are faced with slim margins. With that, comes pressure to improve quality, continue to reduce costs, produce faster and provide more customization for their consumers. Because of this, many manufacturers in aluminum extrusions and panels are using paint robots and automatic applicators to apply coatings for protection and aesthetics.

=== Agriculture and construction equipment ===
Agricultural and construction equipment finish is important because these types of machines face heavy operation in abuse from harsh environments. Coatings help to protect the machines form rust and extend their life cycle. In this industry, product branding plays a big role for many companies trying to differentiate themselves, so high quality finish is a strong factor for many manufacturers.

In order to provide a durable paint coating with strong aesthetic appeal is not an easy task and can involve several layers of different component materials. In an agricultural or construction equipment manufacturer, there are usually multiple pump configurations feeding a plural component proportioning unit that mixes the multiple components of the paint. The proportioner feeds an automatic applicator hooked up to a robot. With several passes with different coatings, consistency is also very important because it minimizes rework and downtime if it is finished right the first time.

=== Cookware ===
Cookware technology continues to evolve using different high performance coatings in order to meet the needs of chefs or people cooking at home. Different types of cookware have unique performance requirements. They need to be able to evenly conduct heat, resist abrasion and impact from repeated utensil use, provide non-stick coatings, provide maximum cleaning ability, and have strong aesthetic appeal. The same pan may need to be coated multiple times with different materials to meet all of its performance requirements.

Paint line robots are very useful paired with an automatic applicator in this environment because each part requires multiple passes with different coatings. The performance of the cookware in each of its specific requirements will hinge solely on the quality of finish of each material. Paint robots provide the same spray pattern and paint path on every pass, minimizing rework for badly finished parts.

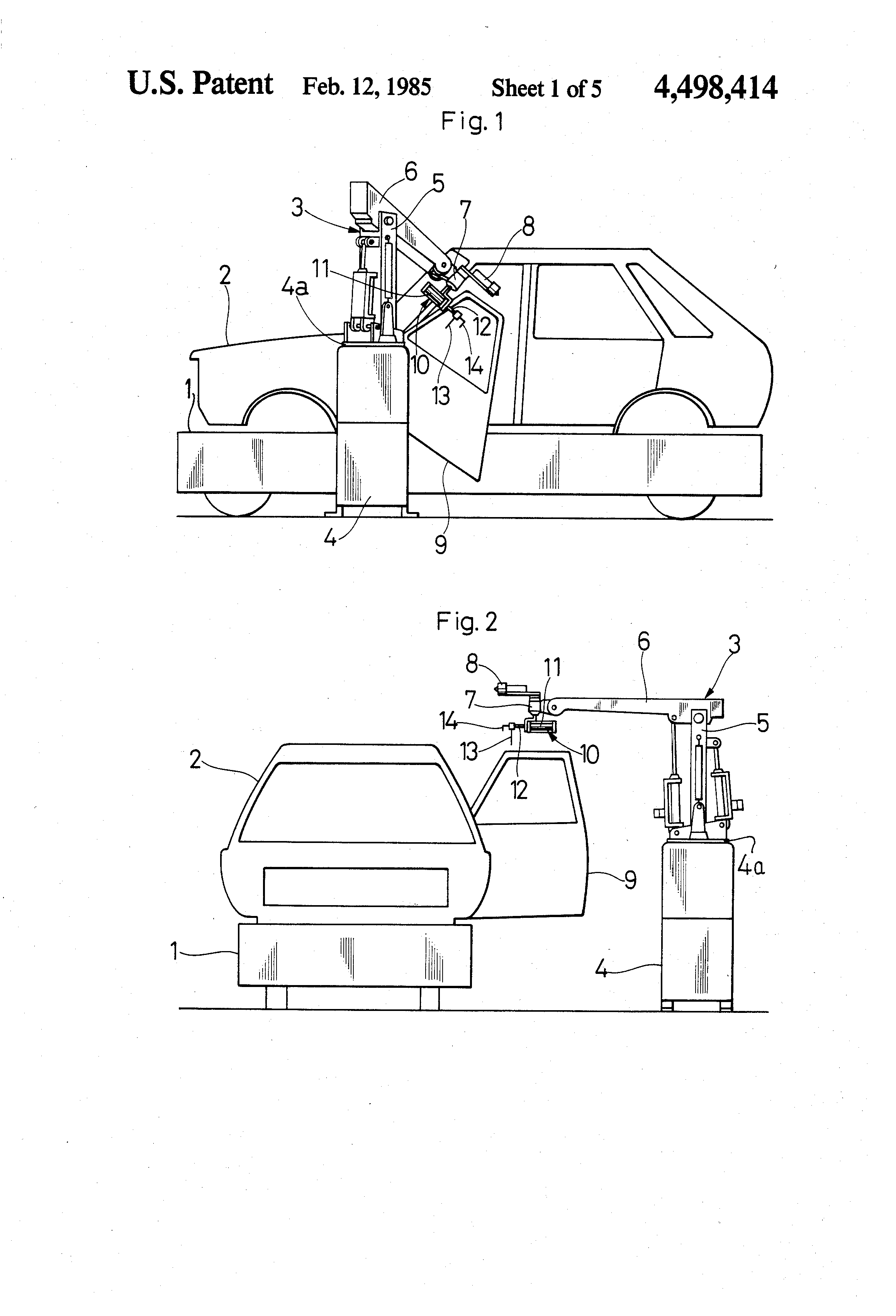
Blueprints for vehicle body painting robot

=== Cosmetics ===
There are many different types of containers used in the cosmetic industry. Manufacturers in this industry are concerned with perfect packaging appearance, many using mirror finishes. Any surface imperfections will cause the piece to be rejected or scrapped. The problem is mirror finishes can actually amplify finish imperfections.

In order to reduce rework costs, the base coat needs to be applied to a very consistent and smooth manner with zero variation. This is accomplished by controlling flow rate from the proportioning unit, having fine atomization from the applicator and a very consistent spray pattern provided from a painting robot.
