= Impulse Fire Extinguishing System =

Fire combatting equipment

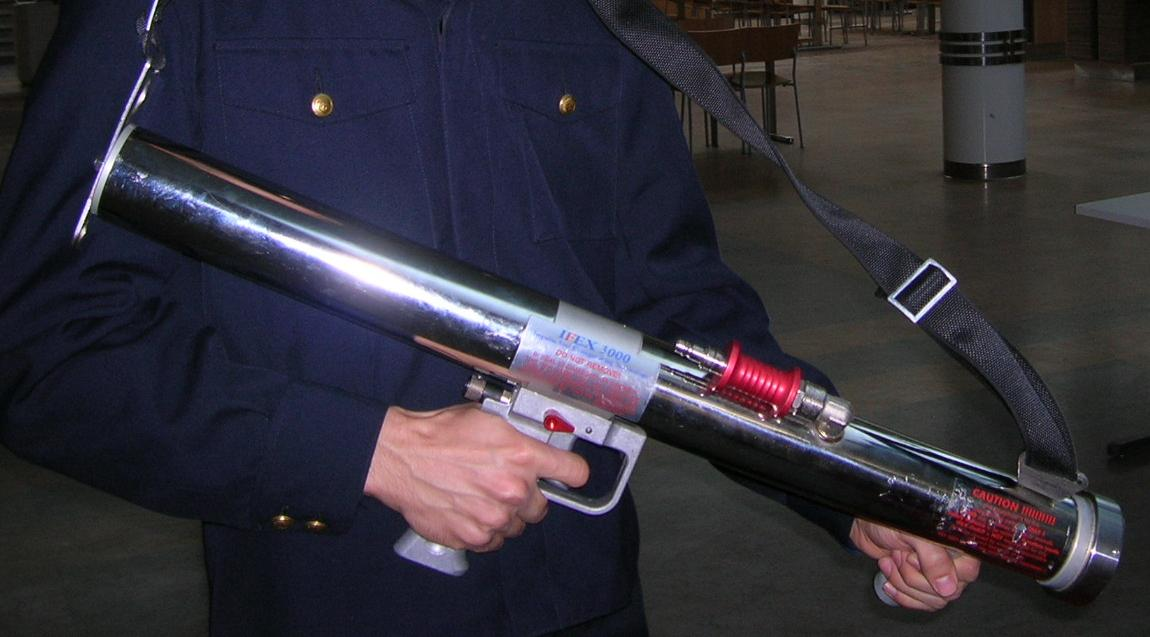
The IFEX handheld impulse gun

The impulse fire extinguishing system (IFFS) is a series of firefighting equipment that uses small amounts of water fired in high-velocity bursts to put out fires. Water droplets are shot in vaporous bursts that can travel at speeds up to 120 metres per second (390 ft/s) and provide a large surface area for cooling.

== See also ==
- Fog nozzle
