= Rotational bell painting =

A rotary atomizer is an automatic electrostatic paint applicator used in high volume, automatic production painting environments. Also called a 'paint bell', "rotary bell atomizer" or 'bell applicator', it is preferred for high volume paint application for its superior transfer efficiency, spray pattern consistency, and low compressed air consumption, when compared to a paint spray gun. It can be mounted in a fixed position, reciprocating arm, or an industrial robot.

== Transfer Efficiency ==
Rotary atomizers can provide highest transfer efficiency of any paint applicator at approximately 95%. This means that the applicator puts an electric charge on each droplet of paint to attract it to the part being sprayed. Rotary atomizers are able to get higher transfer efficiency compared to other spray guns because of its unique spinning bell cup. The bell cup inside the applicator, spins the material at 20,000 to 60,000 revolutions per minute. Due to the high rotation speed, the paint is subjected to high centrifugal force. This forces the paint to flow along the edge of the spinning cup. When it reaches, the edge of the cup, the paint is broken apart into a fine cloud of fluid particles. The droplet size is finer and more consistent than other atomization methods like air spray.

The cloud of paint droplets is directed or shaped by the shaping air coming out of the air cap. This allows us to shape and propel the pattern towards the part. This leads to higher transfer efficiency. In order to achieve maximum transfer efficiency, electrostatic effect is added. The electrostatic charge within the bell cup is formed from the power supply within the rotary atomizer. Each paint particle is charged as it spins inside the bell cup, causing the paint to be attracted to a part that is grounded. This drastically reduces overspray and wasted paint. Electrostatics also help the paint to wrap around the paint and can be very helpful in reducing the number of passes needed to paint a part.

== Assemblies ==
The typical bell applicator consists of five major assemblies: the valve module, the bell cup, the turbine, the shaping air shroud, and the electrostatic system.

The valve module is a manifold consisting of passages for paint, solvent, and compressed air, and valves to control the flow of materials for paint delivery, cleaning and purging with solvent or hydropurge, and management of compressed air to the valves, turbine, and shaping air shroud.

The bell cup is a conical or curved disc fixed to the shaft of the turbine. Paint is injected into the center of the rear of the disc, and is atomized by being forced out to the edge of the cup by centrifugal forces. The flow of the paint over the cup and off the edge breaks up the paint into atomized droplets.

The turbine is a high speed, high precision air motor that rotates the bell cup at speeds ranging from 10,000rpm to 70,000rpm, depending on the cup diameter, atomization desired, and physical properties of the paint. Typical turbines for this application use an air bearing, where the spinning shaft is suspended in a cushion of flowing compressed air, with virtually no frictional resistance.

The shaping air shroud, or shaping air ring, is simply a ring with passages for air to flow out the front of the atomizer, outside of the cup diameter, to manage the size of the spray pattern produced. As more air is forced through the shroud, the atomized paint is forced into a smaller pattern.

The electrostatic system can be internal or external (or direct or indirect charge), and supplies high voltage (30,000 to 100,000 volts DC) charge to the applicator, or the air surrounding it. This has the effect of negatively charging the paint, while causing a region of positive charge to form on the workpiece, resulting in electrostatic attraction between the paint and the workpiece. The electrostatic system is visible only on an external (or indirect) charge applicator, where it appears as a series of 4-8 forward-facing electrodes in a circular array around the bell. It is typically called a 'candelabra' for its resemblance to one.

The bell is also used in powder coating. Although the bell looks different from a topcoat bell.

== Applications ==
Bell applicators are used in wide variety of industries because of its ability to integrate well into automated production environments. Each industry provides its own unique challenges that rotational bell painting can solve. Some of these include: mold release, non-destructive testing, agriculture & construction equipment, backlit displays, electronics, automotive components and parts, wheels and rims, aerospace and defense, wood products and furniture, industrial components, architectural panels and extrusions, cylinders and tanks, cosmetics, glass coating, cookware, footwear and apparel.
