= Spray (liquid drop) =

Dynamic collection of drops dispersed in a gas

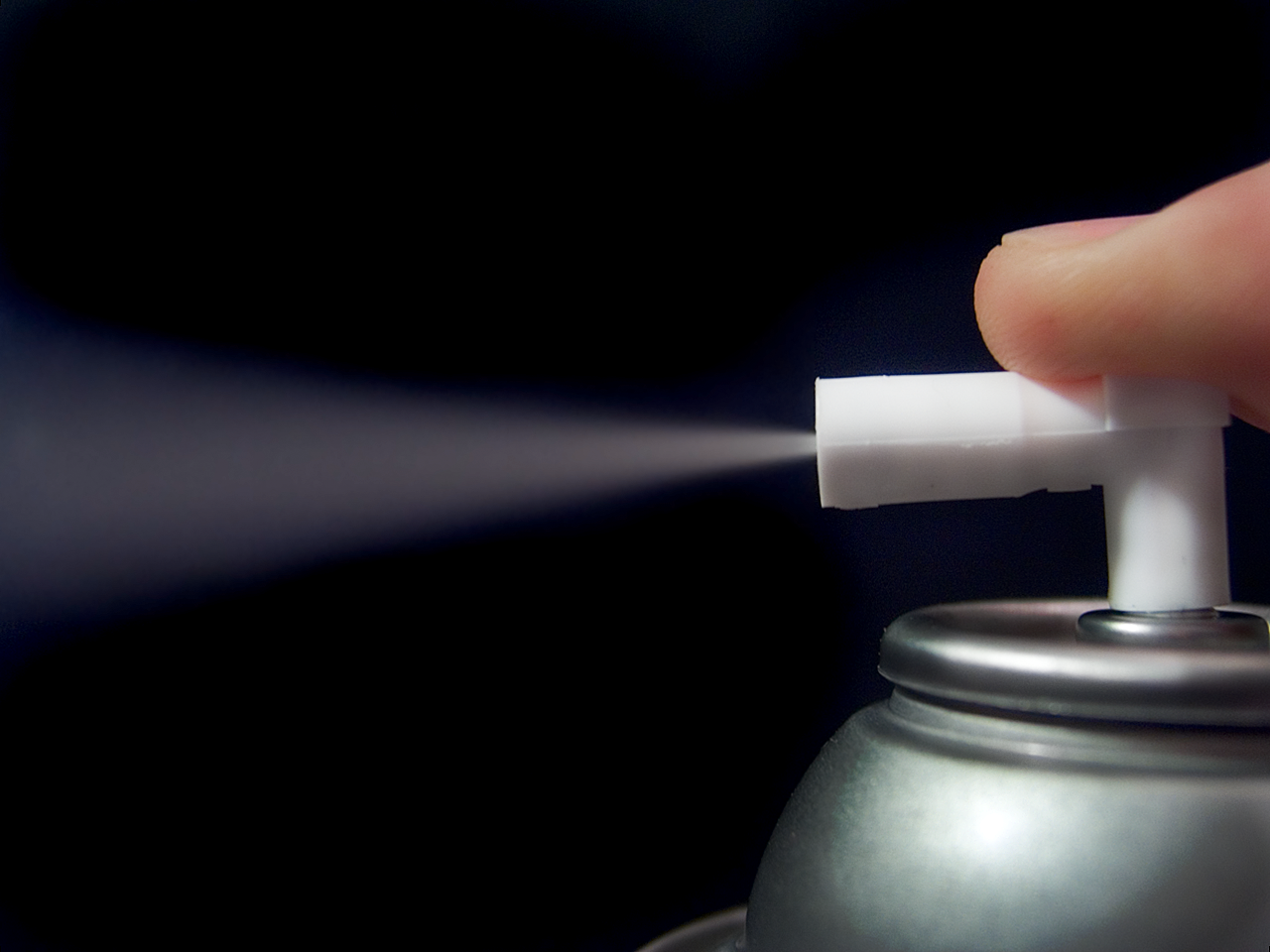
Aerosol spray can

A spray is a dynamic collection of drops dispersed in a gas. The process of forming a spray is known as atomization. A spray nozzle is the device used to generate a spray. The two main uses of sprays are to distribute material over a cross-section and to generate liquid surface area. There are thousands of applications in which sprays allow material to be used most efficiently. The spray characteristics required must be understood in order to select the most appropriate technology, optimal device and size.

== Formation ==
Spray atomization can be formed by several methods. The most common method is through a spray nozzle which typically has a fluid passage that is acted upon by different mechanical forces that atomize the liquid. The first atomizer was invented by Dr Auphon Euget-Les Bain in France in 1849, at a spa in Euzet, France. A portable atomizer was invented by Jean Sales-Girons in 1858, which he called a pulverisateur. Spray formation has taken on several forms, the most common being, pressure sprayers and centrifugal, electrostatic and ultrasonic nozzles.

== Characteristics ==
Spray nozzles are designed to perform under various operating conditions. The following characteristics should be considered when selecting a nozzle:

- Pattern
- Capacity
- Spray impact
- Spray angle
- Drop size

=== Pattern ===
Selecting a nozzle based on the pattern and other spray characteristics that are required generally yields good results. Since spray nozzles are designed to perform under many different spraying conditions, more than one nozzle may meet the requirements for a given application. Surfaces may be sprayed with any pattern shape. Results are fairly predictable, depending on the type of spray pattern specified. If the surface is stationary, the preferred nozzle is usually some type of full cone nozzle, since its pattern will cover a larger area than the other styles. Spatial applications, in which the objective is not primarily to spray onto a surface, are more likely to require specialized spray characteristics. Success in these applications is often completely dependent on factors such as drop size and spray velocity. Evaporation, cooling rates for gases and solids, and cleaning efficiency are examples of process characteristics that may depend largely on spray qualities.

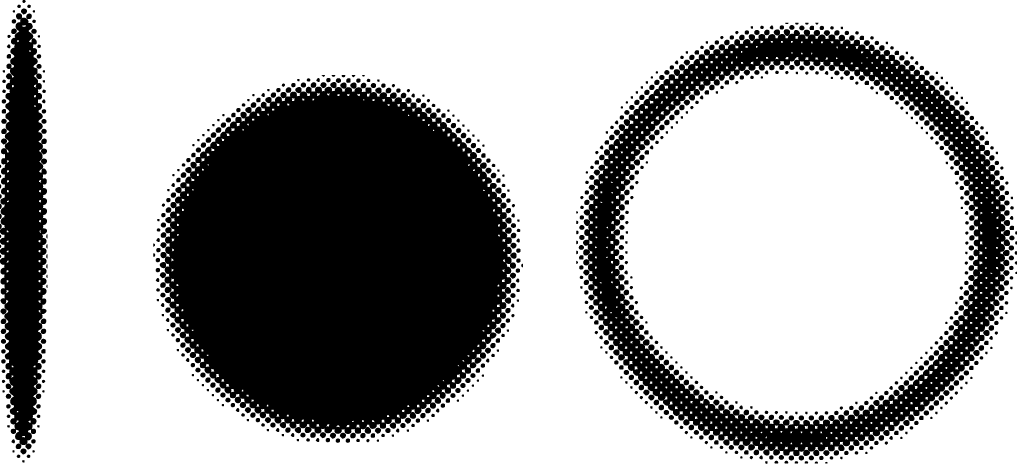
Flat fan, solid cone and hollow cone spray patterns

Each spray pattern is described below with typical end use applications.

==== Solid stream ====
This type of nozzle provides a high impact per unit area and is used in many cleaning applications, for example, tank-cleaning nozzles (fixed or rotary).

==== Hollow cone ====
This spray pattern is a circular ring of liquid. The pattern is achieved by the use of an inlet orifice tangential to a cylindrical swirl chamber that is open at one end. The circular orifice exit has a diameter smaller than the swirl chamber. The whirling liquid results in a circular shape; the center of the ring is hollow. Hollow cone nozzles are best for applications requiring good atomization of liquids at low pressures or when quick heat transfer is needed. These nozzles also feature large and unobstructed flow passages, which provide a relatively high resistance to clogging. Hollow cone nozzles provide the smallest drop size distributions. The relative range of drop sizes tends to be narrower than other hydraulic styles.

The hollow cone pattern is also achievable by the spiral design of nozzle. This nozzle impinges the fluid upon a protruding spiral. This spiral shape breaks the fluid apart into several hollow cone patterns. By altering the topology of the spiral the hollow cone patterns can be made to converge to form a single hollow cone.

==== Full cone ====
Full cone nozzles yield complete spray coverage in a round, oval or square shaped area. Usually the liquid is swirled within the nozzle and mixed with non-spinning liquid that has bypassed an internal vane. Liquid then exits through an orifice, forming a conical pattern. Spray angle and liquid distribution within the cone pattern depend on the vane design and location relative to the exit orifice. The exit orifice design and the relative geometric proportions also affect the spray angle and distribution. Full cone nozzles provide a uniform spray distribution of medium to large size drops resulting from their core design, which features large flow passages. Full cone nozzles are the style most extensively used in industry.

==== Flat spray ====
As the name implies, the spray pattern appears as a flat sheet of liquid. The pattern is formed by an elliptical or a round orifice on a deflective surface that is tangent to the exit orifice. The orifice has an external groove with a contoured internal cylindrical radius, or “cat's eye” shape. In the elliptical orifice design, the pattern sprays out of the orifice in line with the pipe. In the deflector design, the spray pattern is perpendicular to the pipe. There are two categories of flat spray, tapered and even, depending on the uniformity of the spray over the spray pattern. Flat spray patterns with tapering edges are produced by straight-through elliptical spray nozzles. This spray pattern is useful for overlapping patterns between multiple nozzle headers. The result is uniform distribution across the entire sprayed surface. Non-tapered flat spray nozzles are used in cleaning applications that require a uniform spray pattern without any overlap in spray area.

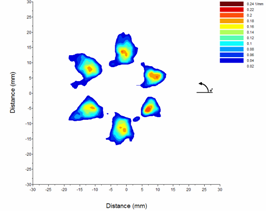
Multiple plume spray

==== Multiple plume spray ====
Multiple plume sprays are routinely used in automotive injectors. The multiple plumes are primarily used to provide for the optimal mixing of fuel and air so as to reduce pollutant emission under different operating conditions. The multiple plume automotive injectors can have anywhere from 2 to 8 plumes. The precise location of the centroid of these plumes, the individual plume angles, and the percentage split of the liquid amongst the plumes are normally obtained using an optical patternator.

=== Capacity ===
Spray nozzle manufacturers all tabulate capacity based on water. Since the specific gravity of a liquid affects its flow rate, the values must be adjusted using the equation below, where Qw is the water capacity and Spg is the specific gravity of the fluid used resulting the volumetric flow rate of the fluid used Qf.

$$Q_f = {Q_w}/\sqrt {S{p_g}} \$$

Nozzle capacity varies with spraying pressure. In general, the relationship between capacity and pressure is as follows:

$${Q_2} = {Q_1}\sqrt {P_2/ P_1}$$

where Q1 is the known capacity at pressure P1, and Q2 is the capacity to be determined at pressure P2.

=== Spray impact ===
Impact of a spray onto the target surface is expressed as the force/area, N/m^{2} or lb/in^{2}. This value depends on the spray pattern distribution and the spray angle. Generally, solid stream nozzles or narrow spray angle flat fan nozzles are used for applications in which high impact is desired, such as cleaning. When a nozzle is used for cleaning, the impact or pressure is called impingement. As with all spray patterns, the unit impact decreases as the distance from the nozzle increases, thereby increasing the impact area size.

The spray impact, $F_l$, depends on the volumetric flowrate Q and pressure drop according to the equation below. The nozzle type and distance between the nozzle and surface affect the constant C.

$${F_l} = CQ\sqrt {\Delta P}$$

=== Spray angle and coverage ===
The spray angle diverges or converges with respect to the vertical axis. As illustrated in the figure below, the spray angle tends to collapse or diverge with increasing distance from the orifice. Spray coverage varies with spray angle. The theoretical coverage, C, of spray patterns at various distances may be calculated with the equation below for spray angles less than 180 degrees. The spray angle is assumed to remain constant throughout the entire spray distance. Liquids more viscous than water form smaller spray angles, or solid streams, depending upon nozzle capacity, spray pressure, and viscosity. Liquids with surface tensions lower than water produce wider spray angles than those listed for water. Spray angles are typically measured using optical or mechanical methods. The optical methods include shadowgraphy, extinction tomography, and Mie Imaging. Sprays angles are important in coating applications to prevent overspraying of the coated materials, in combustion engines to prevent wetting of the cylinder walls, and in fire sprinklers to provide adequate coverage of the protected property.

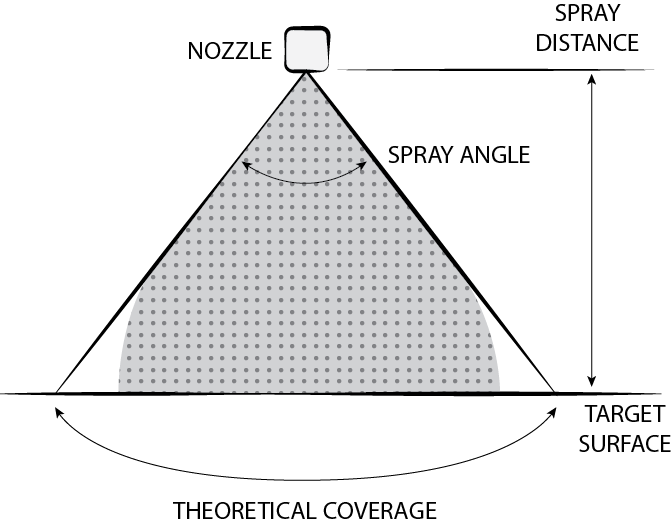
Spray coverage

$${C} = 2D\tan (\theta/2)$$

=== Spray drop size ===
The drop size is the size of the spray drops that make up the nozzle's spray pattern. The spray drops within a given spray are not all the same size. There are several ways to describe the drop sizes within a spray:

• Sauter Mean Diameter (SMD) or D32

- Fineness of spray expressed in terms of surface area produced by the spray.
- Diameter of a drop with the same volume-to-surface area ratio as the total volume of all the drops to the total surface area of all the drops .

• Volume Median Diameter (VMD) DV0.5 and Mass Median Diameter (MMD)

- Drop size expressed in terms of the volume of liquid sprayed.
- Drop size measured in terms of volume (or mass), with 50% of total volume of liquid sprayed drops with diameters larger than median value and 50% with smaller diameter.

Drop sizes are stated in micrometers (μm). One micrometer equals 1/25,400 inch.

==== Drop size distribution ====
The size and/or volume distribution of drops in a spray is typically expressed by the size versus the cumulative volume percent.

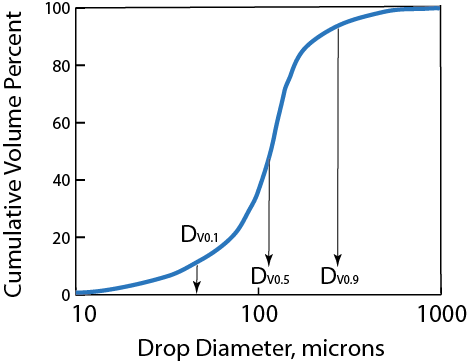
Cumulative drop size distribution graph

==== Relative span factor ====
Comparing drop size distributions from alternate nozzles can be confusing. The Relative Span Factor (RSF) reduces the distribution to a single number. The parameter indicates the uniformity of the drop size distribution. The closer this number is to 1, the more uniform the spray will be (i.e. tightest distribution, smallest variance from the maximum drop size, Dmax, to the minimum drop size, Dmin ). RSF provides a practical means for comparing various drop size distributions.

$${RSF} = \frac {D_{V0.9} - D_{V0.1}}  {D_{V0.5}}$$

==== Drop size measurement ====
Sprays are typically characterized by statistical quantities obtained from size and velocity measurements over many individual droplets. The most widely used quantities are size and velocity probability density distributions as well as fluxes, e.g., number, mass, momentum etc. Through a given plane, some instruments infer such statistical quantities from individual measurements, e.g., number density from light extinction, but very few instruments are capable of making direct size and velocity measurements of individual droplets in a spray. The three most widely used methods of drop size measurements are laser diffraction, optical imaging, and phase Doppler. All of these optical methods are non-intrusive. If all the drops had the same velocity, the measurements of drop size would be the identical for all methods. However, there is a significant difference between the velocity of larger and smaller drops. These optical methods are classified as either spatial or flux based. A spatial sampling method measures the drops in a finite measurement volume. The residence time of drops in the measurement volume affects the results. The flux-based methods sample continually over a measurement cross-section.

Laser diffraction, a spatial sampling method, relies on the principle of Fraunhofer diffraction, which is caused by the light interacting with the drops in the spray. The scattering angle of the diffraction pattern is inversely related to the size of the drop. This nonintrusive method utilizes a long cylindrical optical probe volume. The scattered light passes through a special transforming lens system and is collected on a number of concentric photodiode rings. The signal from the photodiodes is used to back-calculate a drop size distribution. A number of lenses allow measurements from 1.2 to 1800 μm.

The optical imaging method uses a pulsed light, laser or strobe, to generate the shadow graphic image used to determine the size of the drop in the measurement volume. This spatial measurement method has a range from 5 μm to 10,000 μm with lens and optical configuration changes. Image analysis software processes the raw images to determine a circular equivalent drop diameter. This method is best suited to quantify larger diameter drops in medium to low density sprays, opaque liquids (slurries), and ligaments (partially formed drops).

Phase Doppler, a flux-based method, measures particle size and velocity simultaneously. This method, also known as PDPA, is unique because the drop size and velocity information is in the phase angle between the detector signals and the signal frequency shift. Because this method is not sensitive to intensity, it is used in more dense sprays. The range of drop sizes is 1 to 8000 μm. At the heart of the method are crossed laser beams that create interference patterns (regular spaced pattern of light and dark lines) and illuminate drops as they pass through the small measurement zone. A series of three off axis detectors collects the optical signal that is used to determine the phase angle and frequency shift caused by the drops.

Optical imaging and phase Doppler methods measure the size of individual drops. A sufficient number of drops (order of magnitude 10,000 drops) must be quantified to produce a representative distribution and to minimize the effect of random fluctuations. Often several measurement locations in a spray are necessary because the drop size varies over the spray cross-section.

==== Factors affecting drop size ====
Nozzle type and capacity: full cone nozzles have the largest drop size, followed by flat spray nozzles. Hollow cone nozzles produce the smallest drop size. Spraying pressure: drop size increases with lower spraying pressure and decreases with higher pressure. Flow rate: flow rate has a direct effect on drop size. An increase in flow rate will increase the pressure drop and decrease the drop size, while a decrease in flow rate will decrease the pressure drop and increase the drop size.

Spray angle: spray angle has an inverse effect on drop size. An increase in spray angle will reduce the drop size, whereas a reduction in spray angle will increase the drop size.

Liquid properties: viscosity and surface tension increase the amount of energy required to atomize the spray. An increase in any of these properties will typically increase the drop size.

Within each type of spray pattern the smallest capacities produce the smallest spray drops, and the largest capacities produce the largest spray drops. Volume Median Diameter (VMD) is based on the volume of liquid sprayed; therefore, it is a widely accepted measure

==== Spray drop surface area density ====
The drop surface area density is the product of the spray drop surface area and the number of drops per unit volume. The surface area density is very important in evaporation and combustion applications since the local evaporation rate is highly correlated to the surface area density. The extinction of light caused by the drops within a spray is also directly proportion to the surface area density. The two most widely used methods of measuring the surface area density are Laser Sheet Imaging and Statistical Extinction Tomography.

=== Practical considerations ===
Drop size data depend on many variables, and are always subject to interpretation. The following guidelines are suggested to facilitate understanding and effective use of the drop size data.

Data collection repeatability and accuracy
an average value drop size test result is repeatable if the data from individual tests do not deviate by more than ±10%; however, this may be larger or smaller depending on several factors. Accuracy requires a primary standard which is not available for spray measurements.

Instrumentation and reporting bias
to make valid data comparisons, particularly from different sources, it is extremely important to know the type of instrument and range used, the sampling technique, and the percent volume for each size class. Instrumentation and reporting bias directly affect drop size data.

Consider the Application
select the drop size mean and diameter of interest that is best suited for the application. If the object is simply to compare the drop size of alternate nozzles, then the VMD or SMD report are sufficient. Additional information such as RSF, DV90, DV10, and others should be used when appropriate.

== Applications ==
=== Fuel sprays ===
Sprays of hydrocarbon liquids are among the most economically significant applications of sprays. Examples include fuel injectors for gasoline and diesel engines, atomizers for jet engines (gas turbines), atomizers for injecting heavy fuel oil into combustion air in steam boiler injectors, and rocket engine injectors. Drop size is critical because the large surface area of a finely atomized spray enhances fuel evaporation rate. Dispersion of the fuel into the combustion air is critical to maximize the efficiency of these systems and minimize emissions of pollutants (soot, NOx, CO).

=== Electrical power generation ===
Limestone slurry is sprayed with single fluid spray nozzles to control acid gas emissions especially sulfur dioxide (SO2) emissions from coal-fired power plants with liquid scrubbers. Calcium hydroxide (lime) is atomized into a spray dryer absorber to remove acid gases (SO2 and HCl) from coal-fired power plants. Water is sprayed to remove particulate solids using a spray tower or a cyclonic spray scrubber Cooling towers use spray nozzles to distribute water.

=== Food and beverage ===
- Sprays are used to wash fruits and vegetables.
- Spray drying is used to produce hundreds of food products, including instant coffee, powdered soups, and flavor concentrates.
- Coating of food products with flavorings and surface additives.
- Cleaning and sanitizing storage tanks, and process equipment single fluid nozzles are used to rinse and wash away materials. These specialized tank-cleaning nozzles often have a fluid powered rotary motion to increase cleaning effectiveness.

=== Manufacturing ===
Sprays are used extensively in manufacturing. Some typical applications are applying adhesive, lubricating bearings, and cooling tools in machining operations.

- Cleaning components with sprays of hot water and detergent sprays for degreasing, electric motor rebuilding, diesel engine rebuilding, plant maintenance, steel mill bearings, railroad bearings and engine rebuilding.
- High pressure sprays are used to de-burr machined parts.
- Spray painting is broadly used in many manufacturing processes; for example, for automobiles, appliances, office furniture.

=== Paper making ===
- High pressure debarking
- Coating paper
- Cleaning rolls
- Trimming paper

=== Electronics ===
- Spraying etching chemicals and printed circuit boards flux agents

=== Fire protection ===
- Spraying water from fixed sprinklers
- High pressure water misting systems for expensive and delicate equipment, for example, marine engine rooms.
- Deluge systems for protecting assets or keeping potentially explosive materials cool in the event of fire (e.g. gas canisters)
- Water tunnel systems designed to ensure a safe "cool" corridor to allow people to escape in the event of fire.

=== Mining ===
- Water sprays are critical to reducing coal dust during mining
- Water is sprayed to control dust emission produced during grinding; spray nozzles are also used for washing gravel in screening plants.

=== Lime and cement ===
- Suppressing dust from raw materials.
- Feeding fuel to high temperature calcining rotary kilns.
- Cooling and conditioning gas.

=== Steel industry ===
- High pressure water is used to remove scale (iron oxide) from red hot steel during the process of rolling into sheet or strip forms.
- Sprays are used in the continuous casting process and quenching of hot gases.
- Quenching coke from coke-ovens
- Cooling metal extrusions
- Pickling solutions and rinsing pickling solutions

=== Chemical, petrochemical, and pharmaceutical ===
- Spraying reagents to enhance dispersion and to increase liquid-gas mass transfer. Many systems are used, including spray towers.
- Spray drying fluid cracking catalyst for oil refining
- Washing and rinsing solids in filters and centrifuges
- Applying coating to many pharmaceutical tablets

=== Waste treatment ===
- Single fluid nozzles are used to break foam in activated sludge wastewater aeration basins and to apply antifoams.
- Water is spray mixed with material being composted.
- Liquid waste is injected into high temperature incinerators.

=== Agricultural applications ===
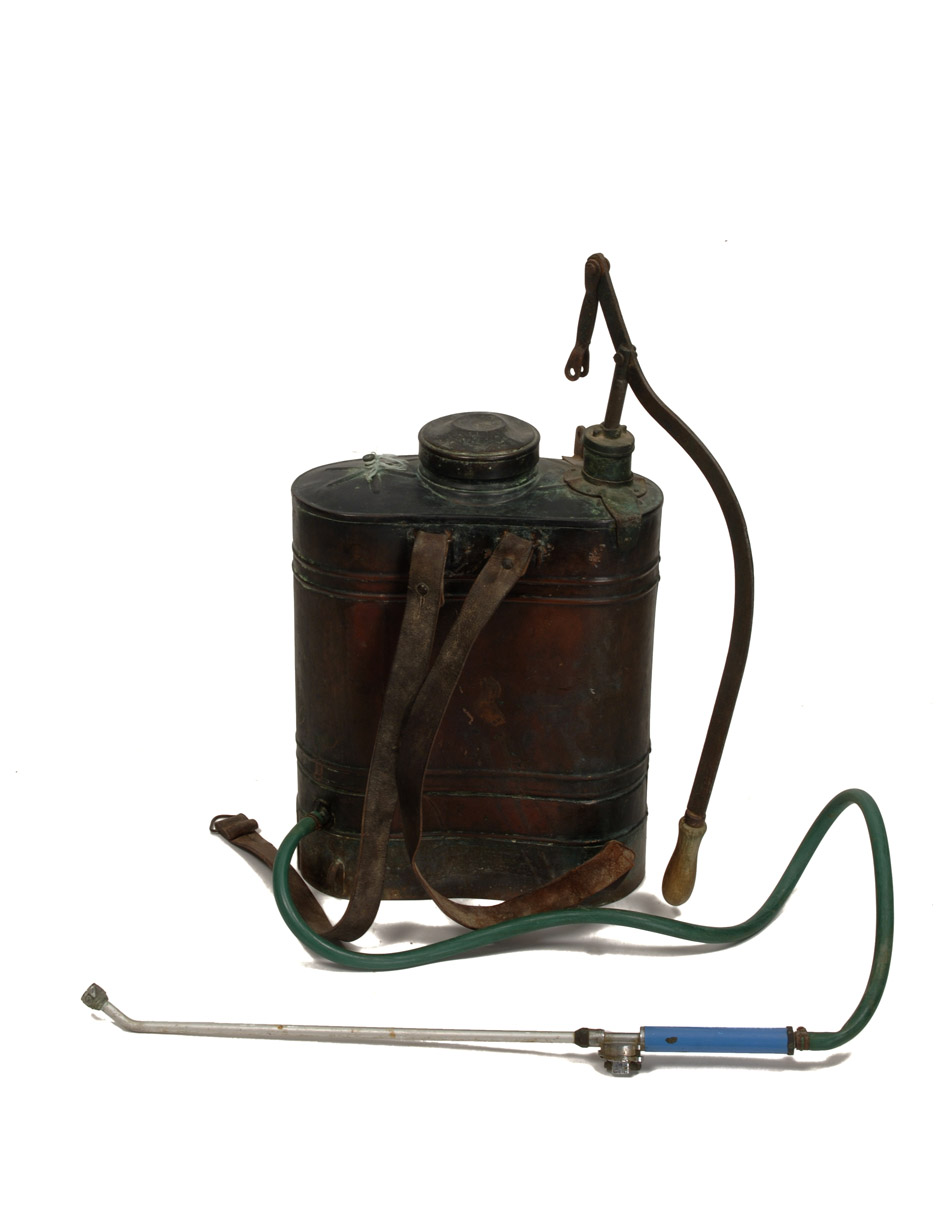
Knapsack sprayer used to sulfate on vegetables. Valencian Museum of Ethnology.

Spray application of herbicides, insecticides, and pesticides is essential to distribute these materials over the intended target surface. Pre-emergent herbicides are sprayed onto soil, but many materials are applied to the plant leaf surface. Agricultural sprays include the spraying of cropland, forest, turf grass, and orchards. The sprayer may be a hand nozzle, on a ground vehicle, or on an aircraft. Herbicides, insecticides and pesticides are spray applied to soil or plant foliage to distribute and disperse these materials. See aerial application, pesticide application, sprayer. The control of spray characteristics is critical to provide the coverage of foliage and to minimize off target drifting of the spray to adjacent areas. (pesticide drift). Spray drift is managed by applying only in appropriate wind conditions and humidity, and by controlling drop size and drop size distribution. Minimizing the height of the spray boom above the crop reduces drift. The spray nozzle type and size and the operating pressure provide the correct application rate of the material and control the amount of driftable fines. Sprays, single fluid nozzles, are also used to cool animals

=== Consumer products ===
Atomizers are used with pump-operated sprays of household cleaning products. The function of these nozzles is to distribute the product over an area. See aerosol spray and spray can

- Water and detergent sprays for the car washing
