= Spray nozzle =

Device that facilitates dispersion of liquid into a spray

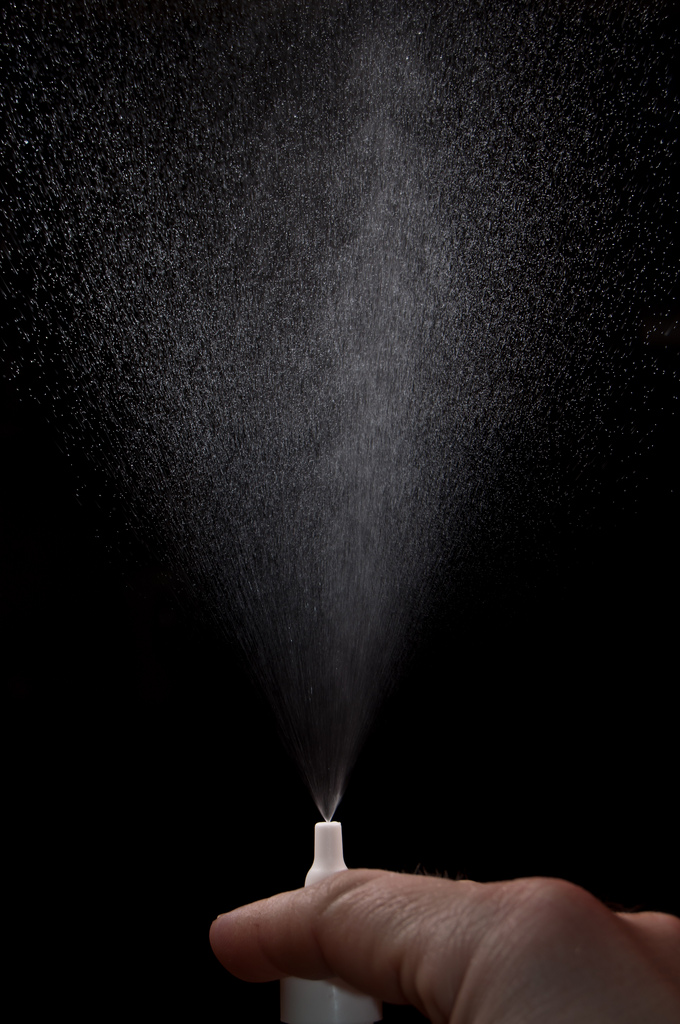
- Actuation of a nasal-spray bottle, used to deliver medication via the nostrils
- Type: Fluid mechanics component / Mechanical device
- Inventor: Thomas A. DeVilbiss (atomizer nozzle adaptation) / Lowell Harrison
- Manufacturer: Various fluid handling and agricultural manufacturers
- Available: Yes

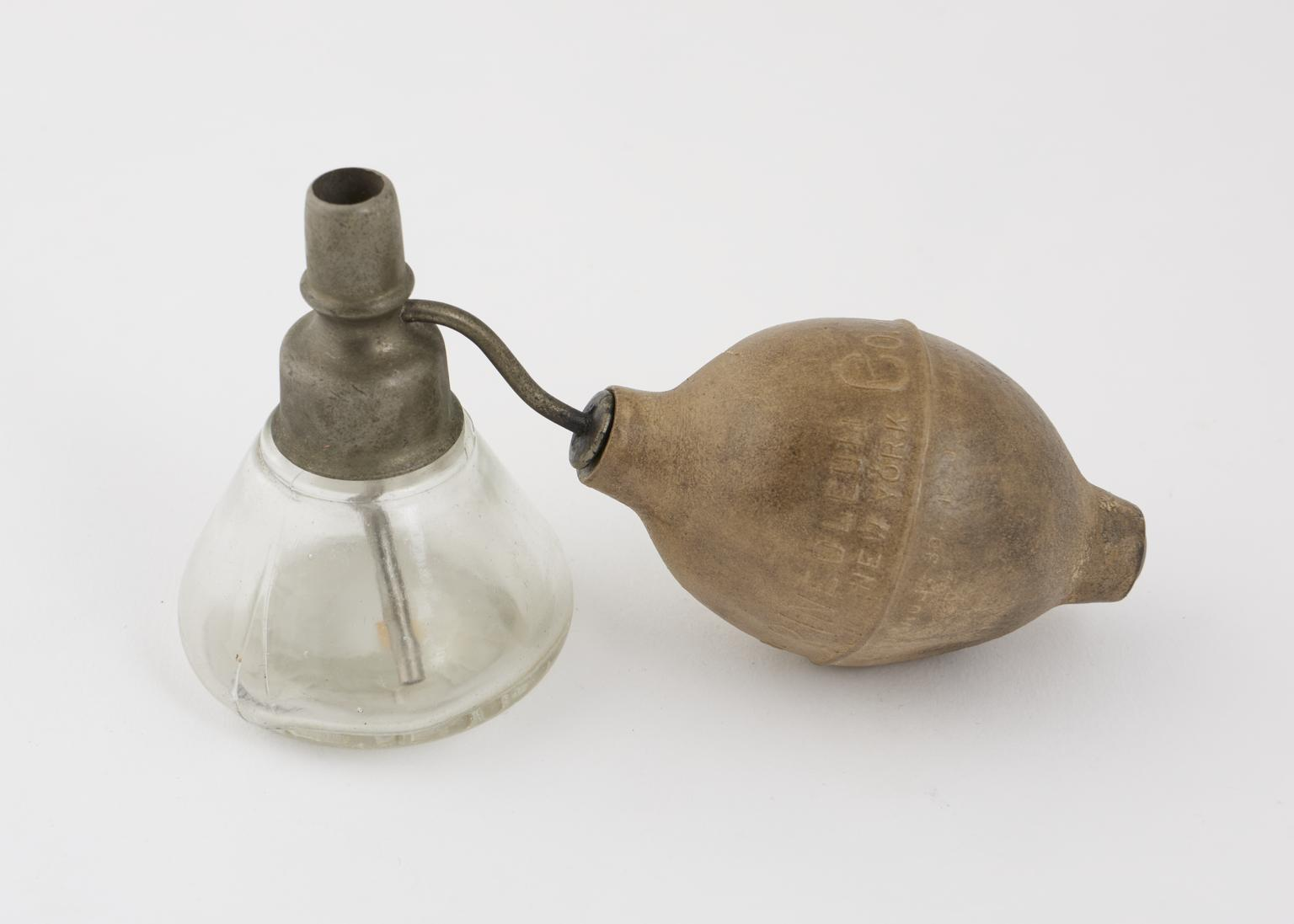
Clondiser, or nasal atomizer, by Pineolum Co., New York, 1890–1930

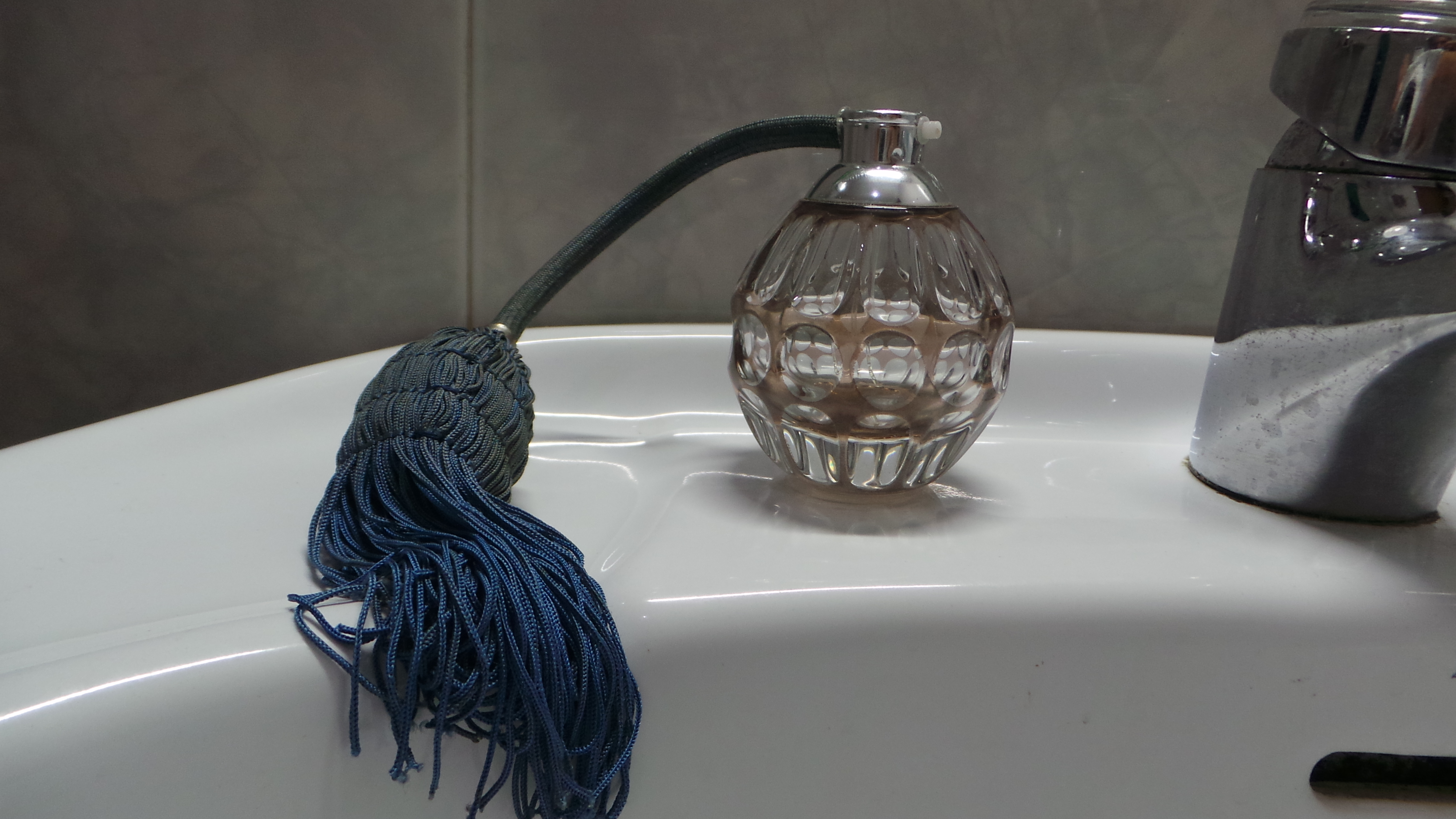
Example of a vintage atomizer nozzle

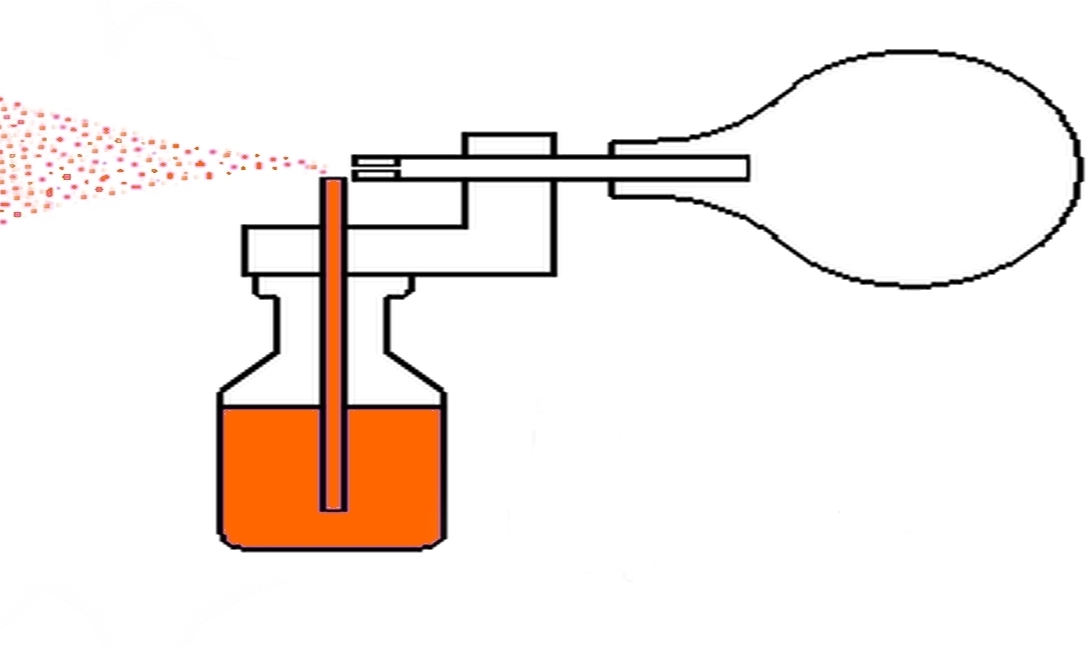
Principle of operation of an atomizer

A spray nozzle or atomizer is a device that facilitates the dispersion of a liquid by the formation of a spray. The production of a spray requires the fragmentation of liquid structures, such as liquid sheets or ligaments, into droplets, often by using kinetic energy to overcome the cost of creating additional surface area. A wide variety of spray nozzles exist, that make use of one or multiple liquid breakup mechanisms, which can be divided into three categories: liquid sheet breakup, jets and capillary waves. Spray nozzles are of great importance for many applications, where the spray nozzle is designed to have the right spray characteristics.

Spray nozzles can have one or more outlets; a multiple outlet nozzle is known as a compound nozzle. Multiple outlets on nozzles are present on spray balls, which have been used in the brewing industry for many years for cleaning casks and kegs. Spray nozzles range from those for heavy duty industrial uses to light duty spray cans or spray bottles.

== Single-fluid nozzles ==
Single-fluid or hydraulic spray nozzles utilize the kinetic energy imparted to the liquid to break it up into droplets. This most widely used type of spray nozzle is more energy efficient at producing surface area than most other types. As the fluid pressure increases, the flow through the nozzle increases, and the drop size decreases. Many configurations of single fluid nozzles are used depending on the spray characteristics desired.

=== Plain-orifice ===
The simplest single fluid nozzle is a plain orifice nozzle as shown in the diagram. This nozzle often produces little if any atomization, but directs the stream of liquid. If the pressure drop is high, at least 25 bars (2,500 kPa; 360 psi), the material is often finely atomized, as in a diesel injector. At lower pressures, this type of nozzle is often used for tank cleaning, either as a fixed position compound spray nozzle or as a rotary nozzle.

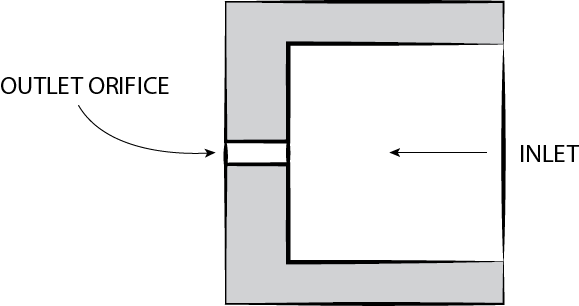
Plain orifice spray nozzle

=== Shaped-orifice ===
The shaped orifice uses a semi spherical shaped inlet and a V notched outlet to cause the flow to spread out on the axis of the V notch. A flat fan spray results which is useful for many spray applications, such as spray painting.

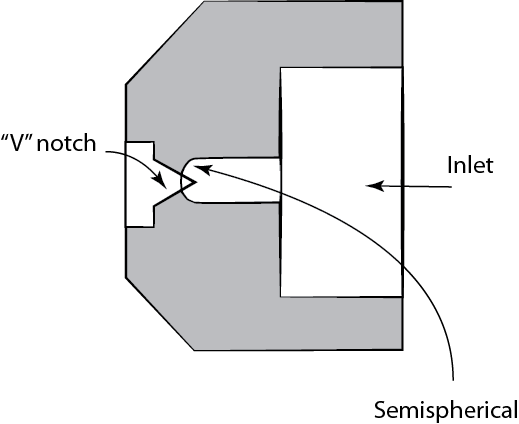
Flat fan spray pattern spray nozzle

=== Surface-impingement single-fluid ===
A surface impingement nozzle causes a stream of liquid to impinge on a surface resulting in a sheet of liquid that breaks up into small drops. This flat fan spray pattern nozzle is used in many applications ranging from applying agricultural herbicides to painting.

The impingement surface can be formed in a spiral to yield a spiral shaped sheet approximating a full cone spray pattern or a hollow-cone spray pattern.

The spiral design generally produces a smaller drop size than pressure swirl type nozzle design, for a given pressure and flow rate. This design is clog resistant due to the large free passage.

Common applications include gas scrubbing applications (e.g., flue-gas desulfurization where the smaller droplets often offer superior performance) and fire fighting (where the mix of droplet densities allow spray penetration through strong thermal currents).

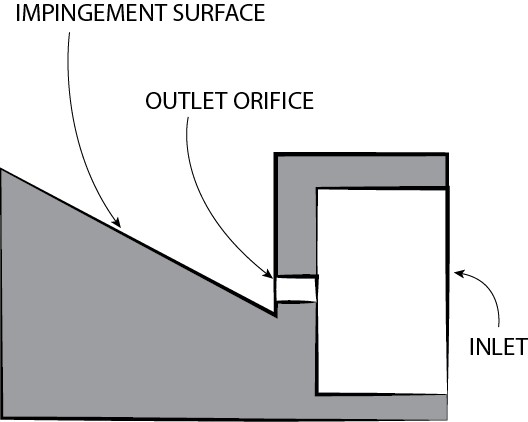
Surface impingement spray nozzle

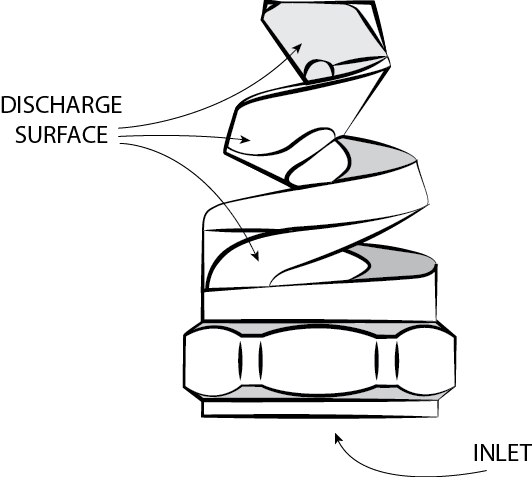
Spiral spray nozzle

=== Pressure-swirl single-fluid ===
Pressure-swirl spray nozzles are high-performance (small drop size) devices with one configuration shown. The stationary core induces a rotary fluid motion which causes the swirling of the fluid in the swirl chamber. A film is discharged from the perimeter of the outlet orifice producing a characteristic hollow cone spray pattern. Air or other surrounding gas is drawn inside the swirl chamber to form an air core within the swirling liquid. Many configurations of fluid inlets are used to produce this hollow cone pattern depending on the nozzle capacity and materials of construction. The uses of this nozzle include evaporative cooling and spray drying.

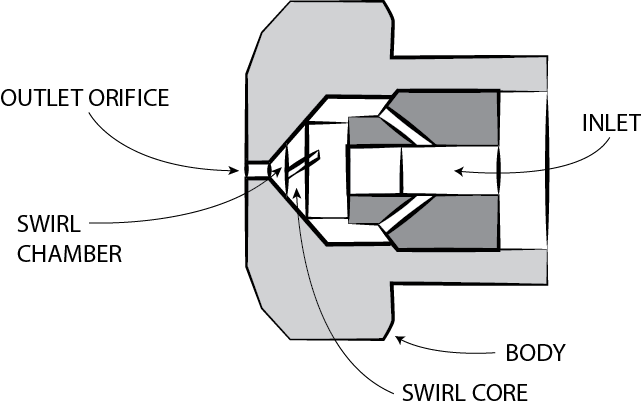
Pressure swirl spray nozzle

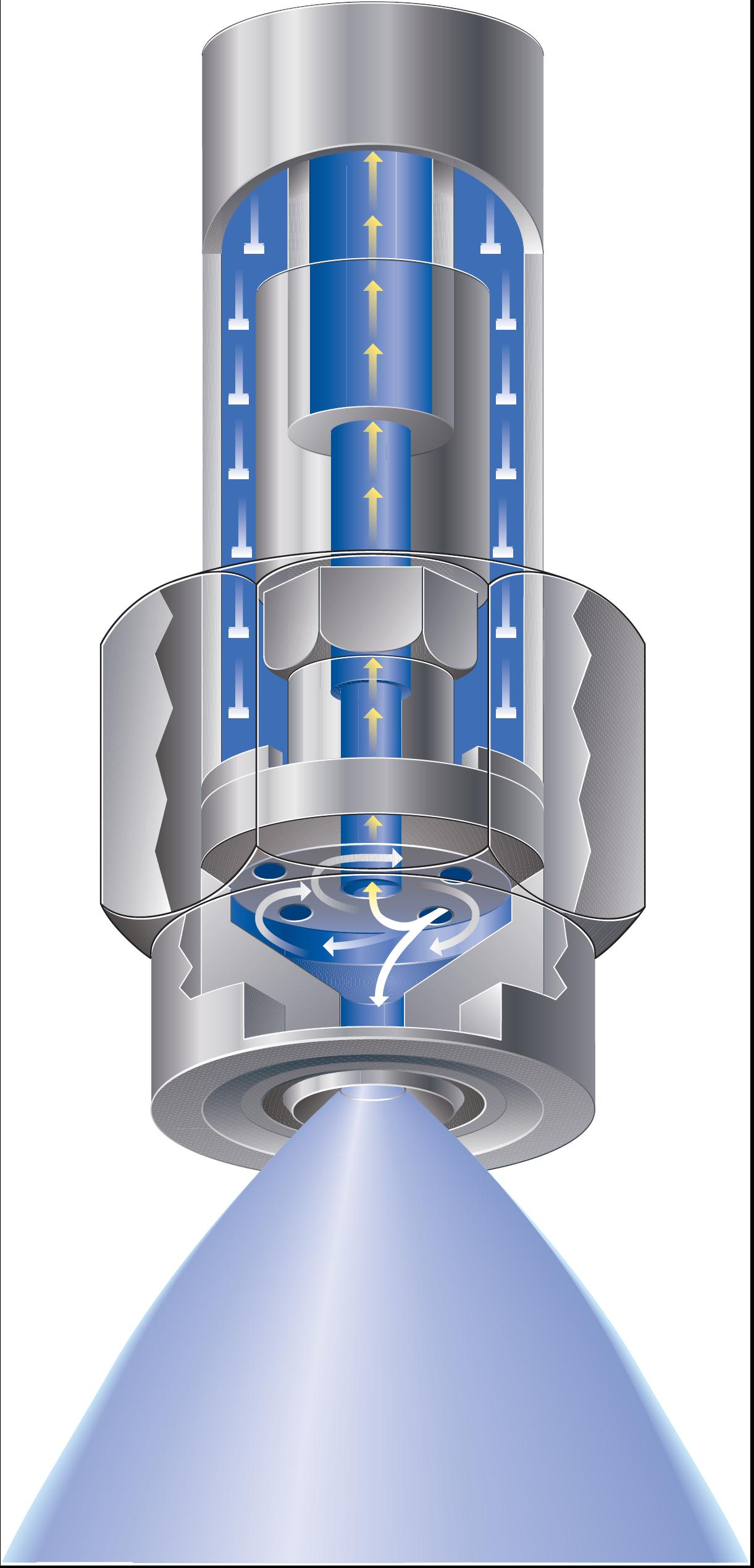
Spillback Nozzle

=== Solid-cone single-fluid ===
One of the configurations of the solid cone spray nozzle is shown in a schematic diagram. A swirling liquid motion is induced with the vane structure, however; the discharge flow fills the entire outlet orifice. For the same capacity and pressure drop, a full cone nozzle will produce a larger drop size than a hollow cone nozzle. The coverage is the desired feature for such a nozzle, which is often used for applications to distribute fluid over an area.

=== Compound ===
A compound nozzle is a type of nozzle in which several individual single or two fluid nozzles are incorporated into one nozzle body, as shown below. This allows design control of drop size and spray coverage angle.

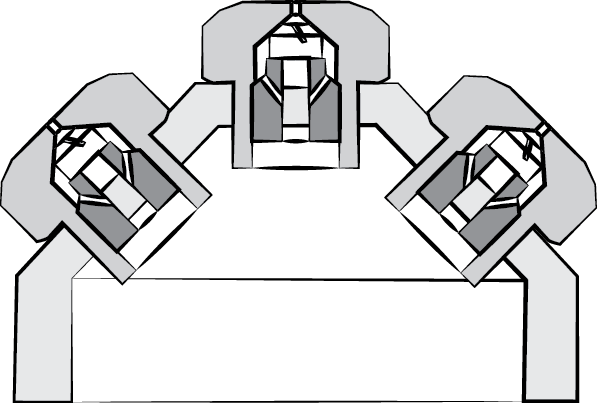
Compound pressure swirl spray nozzle with wide pattern

== Two-fluid nozzles ==
Two-fluid nozzles atomize by causing the interaction of high velocity gas and liquid. Compressed air is most often used as the atomizing gas, but sometimes steam or other gases are used. The many varied designs of two-fluid nozzles can be grouped into internal mix or external mix depending on the mixing point of the gas and liquid streams relative to the nozzle face.

=== Internal-mix two-fluid ===
Internal mix nozzles contact fluids inside the nozzle; one configuration is shown in the figure below. Shearing between high velocity gas and low velocity liquid disintegrates the liquid stream into droplets, producing a high velocity spray. This type of nozzle tends to use less atomizing gas than an external mix atomizer and is better suited to higher viscosity streams. Many compound internal-mix nozzles are commercially used; e.g., for fuel oil atomization.

=== External-mix two-fluid ===
External mix nozzles contacts fluids outside the nozzle as shown in the schematic diagram. This type of spray nozzle may require more atomizing air and a higher atomizing air pressure drop because the mixing and atomization of liquid takes place outside the nozzle. The liquid pressure drop is lower for this type of nozzle, sometimes drawing liquid into the nozzle due to the suction caused by the atomizing air nozzles (siphon nozzle). If the liquid to be atomized contains solids an external mix atomizer may be preferred. This spray may be shaped to produce different spray patterns. A flat pattern is formed with additional air ports to flatten or reshape the circular spray cross-section discharge.

==== Control of two-fluid ====
Many applications use two-fluid nozzles to achieve a controlled small drop size over a range of operation. Each nozzle has a performance curve, and the liquid and gas flow rates determine the drop size. Excessive drop size can lead to catastrophic equipment failure or may have an adverse effect on the process or product. For example, the gas conditioning tower in a cement plant often utilizes evaporative cooling caused by water atomized by two-fluid nozzles into the dust laden gas. If drops do not completely evaporate and strike a vessel wall, dust will accumulate, resulting in the potential for flow restriction in the outlet duct, disrupting the plant operation.

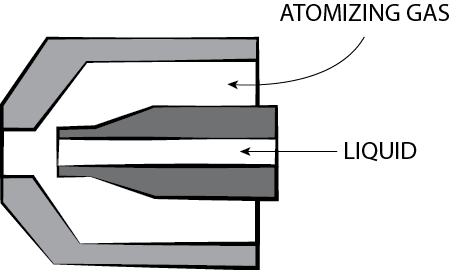
Internal mix two-fluid spray nozzle

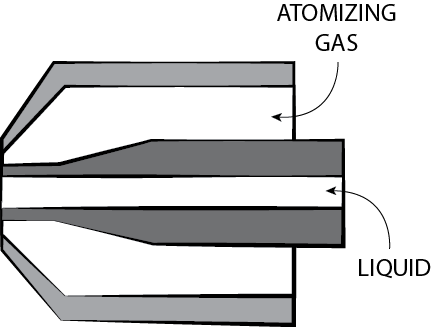
External mix two-fluid spray nozzle

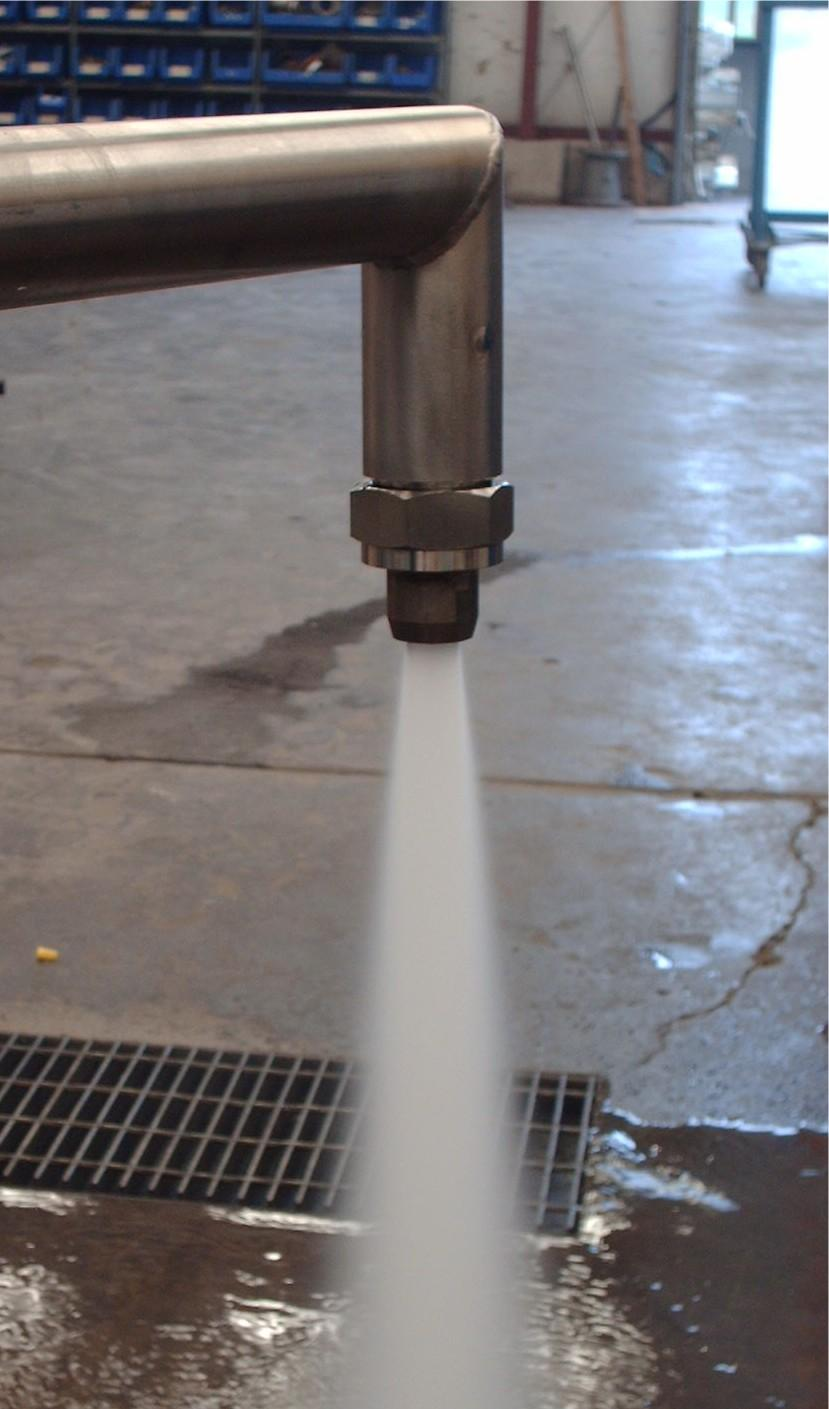
Two-fluid nozzle

== Rotary atomizers ==
Rotary atomizers use a high speed rotating disk, cup or wheel to discharge liquid at high speed to the perimeter, forming a hollow cone spray. The rotational speed controls the drop size. Spray drying and spray painting are the most important and common uses of this technology. They can also be automatic.

== Ultrasonic atomizers ==
This type of spray nozzle utilizes high frequency (20–180 kHz) vibration to produce narrow drop-size distribution and low velocity spray from a liquid. The vibration of a piezoelectric crystal causes capillary waves on the nozzle surface liquid film. An ultrasonic nozzle can be key to high transfer efficiency and process stability as they are very hard to clog. They are particularly useful in medical device coatings for their reliability.

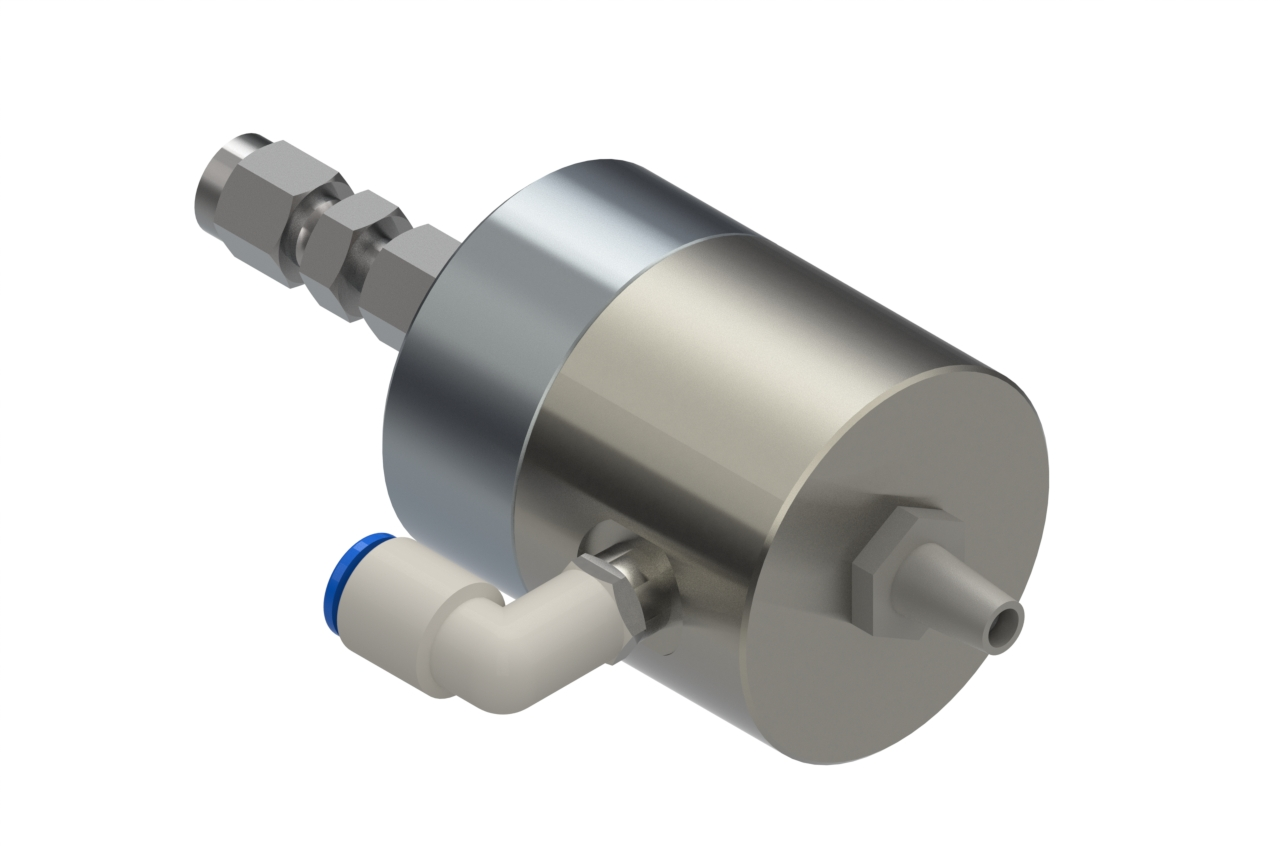
Ultrasonic spray nozzle

== Electrostatic ==
Electrostatic charging of sprays is very useful for high transfer efficiency. Examples are the industrial spraying of coatings (paint) and applying lubricant oils. The charging is at high voltage (20–40 kV) but low current.

== Performance factors ==
=== Liquid properties ===
Almost all drop size data supplied by nozzle manufacturers are based on spraying water under laboratory conditions, 21 °C (70 °F). The effect of liquid properties should be understood and accounted for when selecting a nozzle for a process that is drop size sensitive.

=== Temperature ===
Liquid temperature changes do not directly affect nozzle performance, but can affect viscosity, surface tension, and specific gravity, which can then influence spray nozzle performance.

=== Specific gravity ===
Specific gravity is the ratio of the mass of a given volume of liquid to the mass of the same volume of water. In spraying, the main effect of the specific gravity Sg of a liquid other than water is on the capacity of the spray nozzle. All vendor-supplied performance data for nozzles are based on spraying water. To determine the volumetric flowrate Q, of a liquid other than water the following equation should be used.

$${Q_f} = {Q_{water}}\sqrt \frac{1}{Sg}$$

=== Viscosity ===
Dynamic viscosity is defined as the property of a liquid that resists change in the shape or arrangement of its elements during flow. Liquid viscosity primarily affects spray pattern formation and drop size. Liquids with a high viscosity require a higher minimum pressure to begin spray pattern formation and yield narrower spray angles compared to water.

=== Surface tension ===
The surface tension of a liquid tends to assume the smallest possible size, acting as a membrane under tension. Any portion of the liquid surface exerts a tension upon adjacent portions or upon other objects that it contacts. This force is in the plane of the surface, and its amount per unit of length is surface tension. The value for water is about 0.073 N/m (0.0050 lb_{f}/ft) at 21 °C (70 °F). The main effects of surface tension are on minimum operating pressure, spray angle, and drop size. Surface tension is more apparent at low operating pressures. A higher surface tension reduces the spray angle, particularly on hollow cone nozzles. Low surface tensions can allow nozzles to be operated at lower pressures.

=== Nozzle wear ===
Nozzle wear is indicated by an increase in nozzle capacity and by a change in the spray pattern, in which the distribution (uniformity of spray pattern) deteriorates and increases drop size. Choice of a wear-resistant material of construction increases nozzle life. Because many single fluid nozzles are used to meter flows, worn nozzles result in excessive liquid usage.

=== Material of construction ===
The material of construction is selected based on the fluid properties of the liquid that is to be sprayed and the environment surrounding the nozzle. Spray nozzles are most commonly fabricated from metals, such as brass, Stainless steel, and nickel alloys, but plastics such as PTFE and PVC and ceramics (alumina and silicon carbide) are also used. Several factors must be considered, including erosive wear, chemical attack, and the effects of high temperature.

== Applications ==
Automotive coating: Automotive coating demands droplets 10–100 μm (0.39–3.94 mils) in size uniformly deposited on substrate. Applications of spray technology are more pronounced during the course of base and clear coatings process which are encompassed as the last stages in automotive coating. Among others rotary bells mounted on robots and hvlp (high volume, low pressure) sprayers are widely used to paint car bodywork during manufacture. Agricultural spraying may involve hydraulic, twin fluid and rotary nozzles: discussed further under pesticide application.

== See also ==
- Aerosol spray
- Flit gun
- Dehumidifier
- Humidifier
- Nozzle
- Nebulizer
- Pesticide application
- Institute for Liquid Atomization and Spray Systems (ILASS)
- Spray bottle
