= Ultrasonic nozzle =

Type of spray nozzle

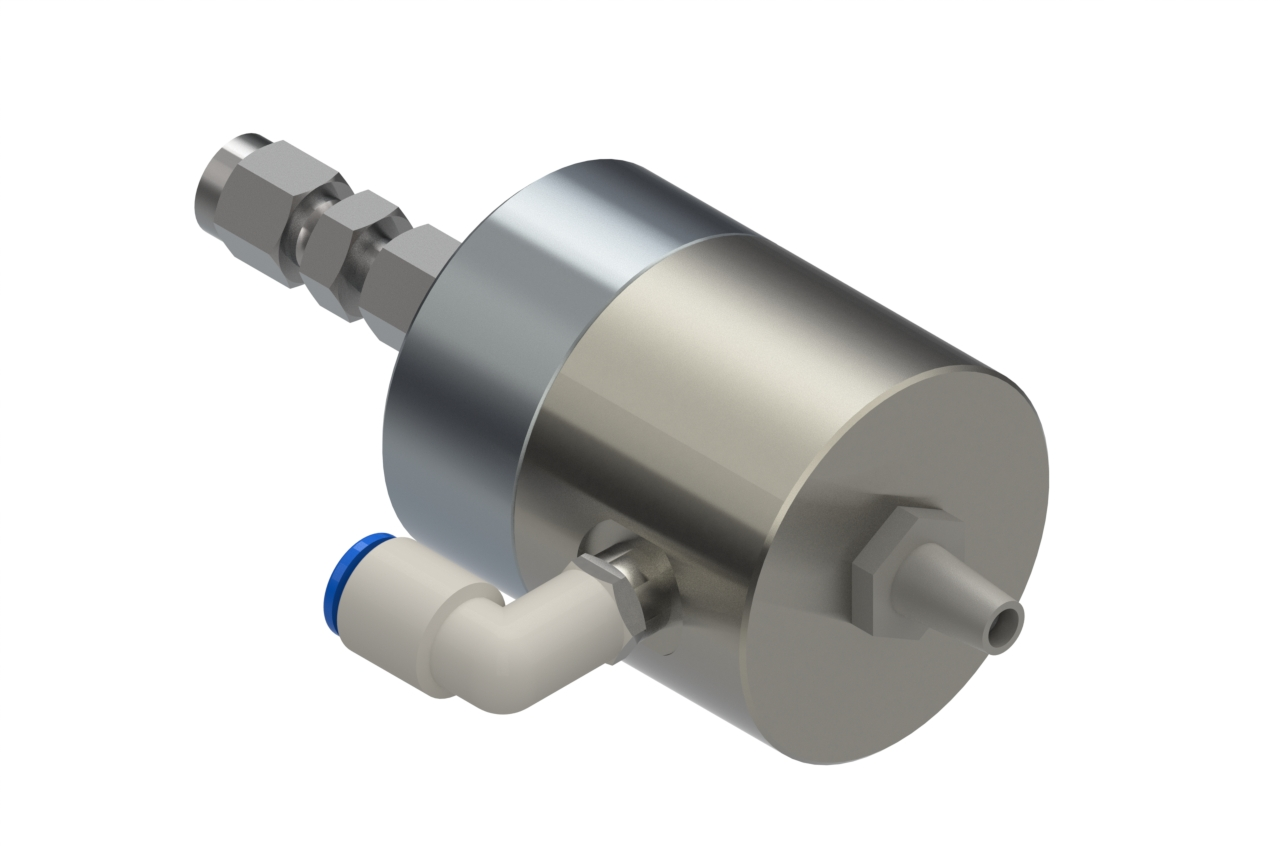
Rendering of an ultrasonic nozzle

Ultrasonic nozzles are a type of spray nozzle that use high frequency vibrations produced by piezoelectric transducers acting upon the nozzle tip that create capillary waves in a liquid film. Once the amplitude of the capillary waves reaches a critical height (due to the power level supplied by the generator), they become too tall to support themselves and tiny droplets fall off the tip of each wave resulting in atomization.

The primary factors influencing the initial droplet size produced are frequency of vibration, surface tension, and viscosity of the liquid. Frequencies are commonly in the range of 20–180 kHz, beyond the range of human hearing, where the highest frequencies produce the smallest drop size.

== History ==
In 1962 Dr. Robert Lang followed up on this work, essentially proving a correlation between his atomized droplet size relative to Rayleigh's liquid wavelength. Ultrasonic nozzles were first commercialized by Dr. Harvey L. Berger. US A 3861852, "Fuel burner with improved ultrasonic atomizer", published Jan 21, 1975, assigned to Harvey Berger.

== Applications ==
Subsequent uses of the technology include coating blood collection tubes, spraying flux onto printed circuit boards, coating implantable drug eluting stents and balloon/catheters, float glass manufacturing coatings, anti-microbial coatings onto food, precision semiconductor coatings and alternative energy coatings for solar cell and fuel cell manufacturing, among others.

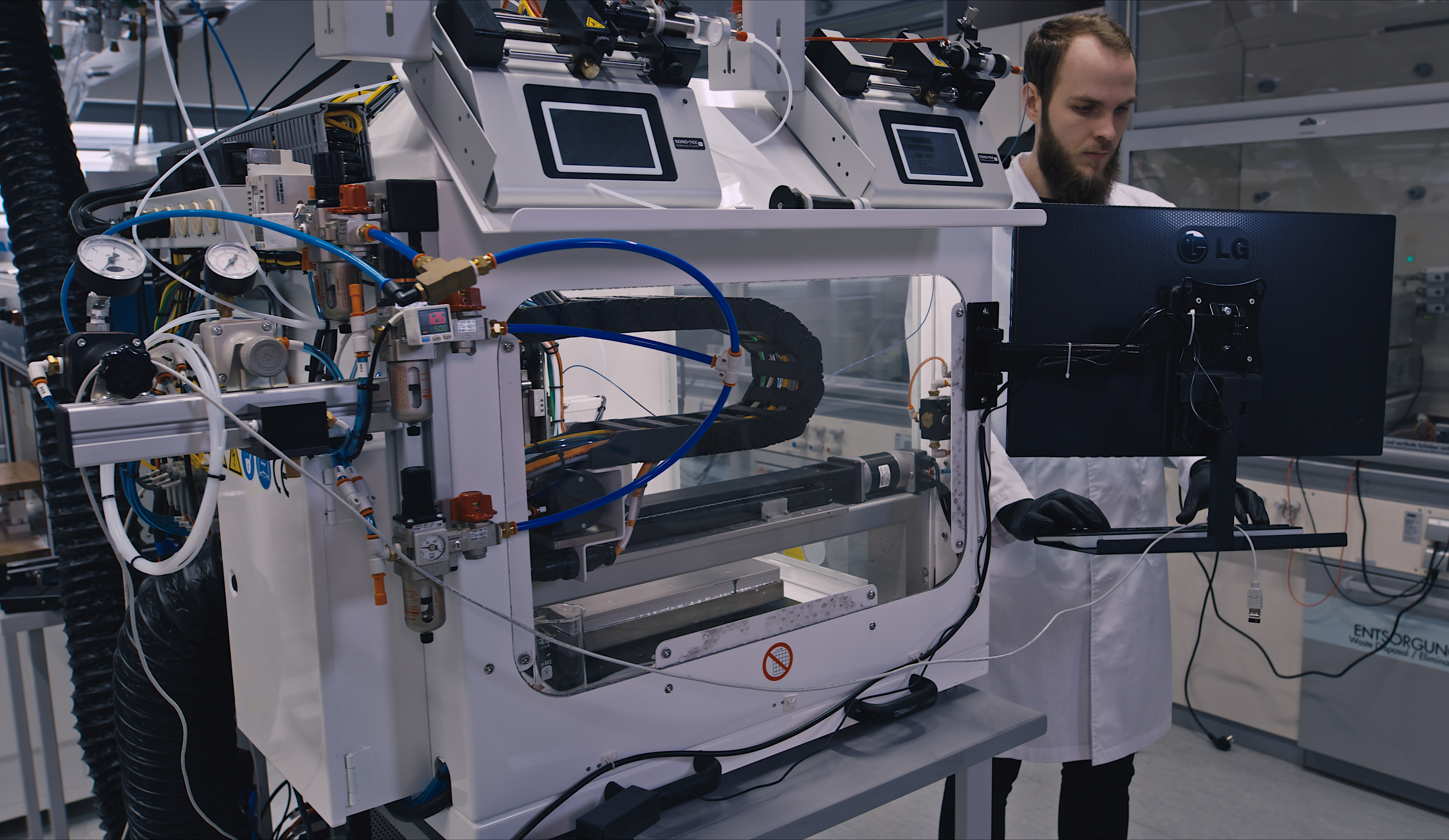
PEM active layer deposition by ultrasonic spraying. Ultrasonic spraying first creates tiny droplets that deposit on the surface of the Nafion membrane, creating a uniform layer of platinum-carbon catalyst

=== Drug eluting stents and drug-coated balloons ===
Pharmaceuticals such as Sirolimus (also called rapamycin) and paclitaxel are coated on the surface of drug eluting stents (DES) and drug-coated balloons (DCB). These devices benefit greatly from ultrasonic spray nozzles for their ability to apply coatings with little to no loss. Medical devices such as DES and DCB require very narrow spray patterns, a low-velocity atomized spray and low-pressure air because of their small size.

=== Fuel cells ===
Research has shown that ultrasonic nozzles can be effectively used to manufacture proton exchange membrane fuel cells. The inks typically used are a platinum-carbon suspension, where the platinum acts as a catalyst inside the cell. Traditional methods to apply the catalyst to the proton exchange membrane typically involve screen printing or doctor-blades. However, these methods can result in undesirable cell performance due to the tendency of the catalyst to form agglomerations resulting in non-uniform gas flow in the cell and prohibiting the catalyst from being fully exposed, running the risk that the solvent or carrier liquid may be absorbed into the membrane, both of which impeded proton exchange efficiency. When ultrasonic nozzles are used, the spray can be made to be as dry as necessary by the nature of the small and uniform droplet size, by varying the distance the droplets travel and by applying low heat to the substrate such that the droplets dry in the air before reaching the substrate. Process engineers have finer control over these types of variables as opposed to other technologies. Additionally, because the ultrasonic nozzle imparts energy to the suspension just prior to and during atomization, possible agglomerates in the suspension are broken up resulting in homogenous distribution of the catalyst, resulting in higher efficiency of the catalyst and in turn, the fuel cell.

=== Transparent conductive films ===
Ultrasonic spray nozzle technology has been used to create films of indium tin oxide (ITO) in the formation of transparent conductive films (TCF). ITO has excellent transparency and low sheet resistance, however it is a scarce material and prone to cracking, which does not make it a good candidate for the new flexible TCFs. Graphene on the other hand can be made into a flexible film, extremely conductive and has high transparency. Ag nanowires (AgNWs) when combined with Graphene have been reported to be a promising superior TCF alternative to ITO. Prior studies focus on spin and bar coating methods which are not suitable for large area TCFs. A multi-step process utilizing ultrasonic spray of graphene oxide and conventional spray of AgNWs followed by a hydrazine vapor reduction, followed by the application of polymethylmethacrylate (PMMA) topcoat resulted in a peelable TCF that can be scaled to a large size.

=== Carbon nanotubes ===
CNT thin films are used as alternative materials to create transparent conducting films (TCO layers) for touch panel displays or other glass substrates, as well as organic solar cell active layers.

=== Photoresist spray onto MEMs wafers ===
Microelectromechanical systems (MEMs) are small microfabricated devices that combine electrical and mechanical components. Devices vary in size from below one micron to millimeters in size, functioning individually or in arrays to sense, control, and activate mechanical processes on the micro scale. Examples include pressure sensors, accelerometers, and microengines. Fabrication of MEMs involves depositing a uniform layer of photoresist onto the Si wafer. Photoresist has traditionally been applied to wafers in IC manufacturing using a spin coating technique. In complex MEMs devices that have etched areas with high aspect ratios, it can be difficult to achieve uniform coverage along the top, side walls, and bottoms of deep grooves and trenches using spin coating techniques due to the high rate of spin needed to remove excess liquid. Ultrasonic spray techniques are used to spray uniform coatings of photoresist onto high aspect ratio MEMs devices and can minimize usage and overspray of photoresist.

=== Printed circuit boards ===
The non-clogging nature of ultrasonic nozzles, the small and uniform droplet size created by them, and the fact that the spray plume can be shaped by tightly controlled air shaping devices makes the application quite successful in wave soldering processes. The viscosity of nearly all fluxes on the market fit well within the capabilities of the technology. In soldering, "no-clean" flux is highly preferred. But if excessive quantities are applied the process will result in corrosive residues on the bottom of the circuit assembly.

=== Solar cells ===
Photovoltaic and dye-sensitized solar technology both need the application of liquids and coatings during the manufacturing process. With most of these substances being very expensive, any losses due to over-spray or quality control are minimized with the use of ultrasonic nozzles. In efforts to reduce the manufacturing costs of solar cell, traditionally done using the batch-based phosphoryl chloride or POCl_{3} method, it has been shown that using ultrasonic nozzles to lay a thin aqueous-based film onto silicon wafers can effectively be used as a diffusion process to create N-type layers with uniform surface resistance.

=== Ultrasonic spray pyrolysis ===
Ultrasonic spray pyrolysis is a chemical vapor deposition (CVD) method utilized in the formation of a variety of materials in thin film or nanoparticle form. Precursor materials are often fabricated through sol-gel methods and examples include the formation of aqueous silver nitrate, synthesis of zirconia particles, and fabrication of solid oxide fuel cell SOFC cathodes.

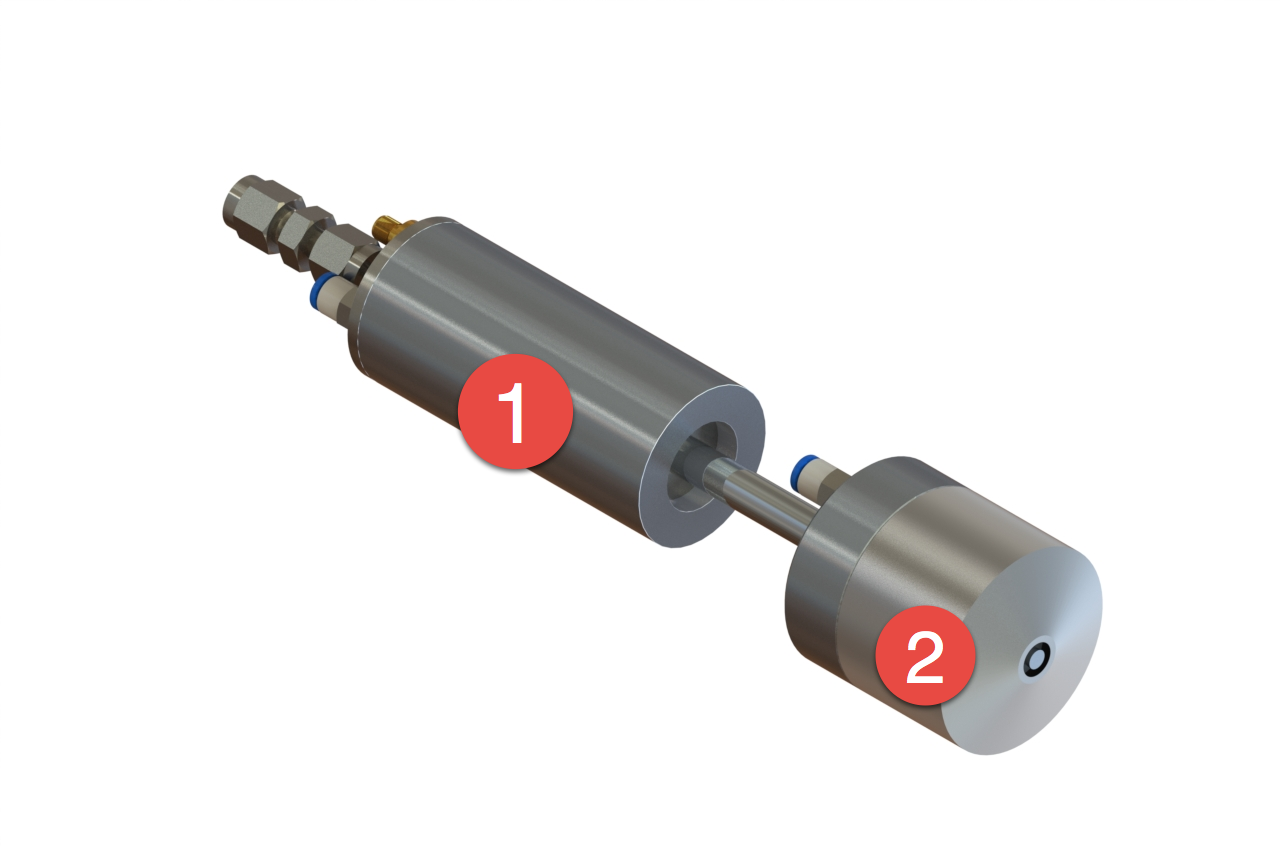
High Temperature Ultrasonic Nozzle

An atomized spray produced from an ultrasonic nozzle is subjected to a heated substrate typically ranging from 300–400 degrees C. Due to the high temperatures of the spray chamber, extensions to the ultrasonic nozzle (as pictured and labeled – High Temperature Ultrasonic Nozzle) such as a removable tip (tip is hidden under the vortex air shroud labeled #2) have been designed to be subjected to high temperatures while protecting the body (labeled #1) of the ultrasonic nozzle that contains temperature sensitive piezoelectric elements, typically outside of the spray chamber or by other means of isolation.
