= Vanina Farber =

Argentine-Italian academic

- Born: Argentina
- Occupations: Economist, political scientist, academic
- Title: elea Professor of Social Innovation

Academic background
- Education: University of Buenos Aires; University of Memphis

Academic work
- Discipline: Economics, political science
- Sub-discipline: Social innovation, social entrepreneurship, impact investing, sustainable finance
- Institutions: International Institute for Management Development; Universidad del Pacífico; IE Business School; Pontifical Catholic University of Peru
- Main interests: Social innovation Impact investing Sustainable finance ESG; Gender lens investing Humanitarian finance
- Notable works: The elea Way: A Learning Journey Toward Sustainable Impact

Vanina A. Farber is an Argentine-born Italian economist and political scientist who holds the elea Chair on Social Innovation at the International Institute for Management Development (IMD) in Lausanne, Switzerland and also serves as Co-Director of elea Center for Social Innovation. Previously, she served as the first female Dean of IMD's Executive MBA (EMBA) programme from 2022 to 2026.

== Early life and education ==
Farber was born in Argentina. She earned a bachelor's degree in political science from the University of Buenos Aires. She later moved to the United States to study at the University of Memphis, where she earned a Master of Arts in economics and a PhD in business administration.

== Career ==
In 2009, Farber joined Centrum Católica, the business school of the Pontifical Catholic University of Peru, as professor and served until 2011. At Centrum Católica, she researched corporate social responsibility and business ethics.

In 2011, Farber joined Universidad del Pacífico in Lima, Peru, as Professor and Chair of Sustainable Entrepreneurship and Social Inclusion and served as Dean of the Graduate School of Business from 2014 to 2016. During this period, she also worked as a researcher and consultant for international organizations including ILO, UNDP, and UNOPS.

In 2018, Farber became the first holder of the elea Chair on Social Innovation at IMD, a position created through a CHF 3 million donation from the founding family of the Swiss-based elea Foundation for Ethics in Globalization. At IMD, she leads the elea Center for Social Innovation, which researches how private capital can be deployed at scale for projects with social impact and how private, public, and philanthropic investors can collaborate.

In 2019, Farber developed one of IMD's first custom programmes on ESG integration for CaixaBank Asset Management. She later helped CaixaVida expand ESG integration across the group. She also contributed to a programme for HSBC board candidates on ESG risks and opportunities.

In 2021, IMD President Jean-Francois Manzoni announced that Farber would become the fifth Dean of IMD's Executive MBA (EMBA) programme, succeeding Stefan Michel. She held the role from 2022 to 2026. She also directs IMD's Driving Innovative Finance for Impact (DIFI) open programme, launched in 2022 in partnership with the International Committee of the Red Cross, Lombard Odier, and the World Economic Forum.

Farber is a member of the Swiss Lab for Sustainable Finance, the Gender Lens Initiative for Switzerland, and the World Economic Forum's Global Future Council (GFC) for Reimagining Aid. She is also an advisory board member of the Impact Finance Forum, Peru Impact Investment Advisory Board for Aliados de Impacto (Quiénes somos - Aliados de Impacto), Linzor Capital, and BASE Foundation. Previously, she served on the international academic advisory board of Católica Porto Business School in Portugal.

== Research ==
Farber's research examines market-oriented approaches to addressing poverty and social exclusion, with a focus on scaling social businesses, last-mile distribution in inclusive value chains, and the application of a gender lens to investment and entrepreneurship. Her early work focused on macroeconomic stabilization in Latin America and the labor market integration of immigrants in Spain.

In 2020, Farber co-authored The elea Way: A Learning Journey Toward Sustainable Impact with Peter Wuffli, founder and chairman of the elea Foundation and former chief executive of UBS. The book examines the foundation's philanthropic impact investing model and argues for an inclusive capitalism that combines entrepreneurship and capital to address absolute poverty.

In 2024, Farber co-authored the IMD report Navigating Humanitarian Impact Finance with Patrick Reichert, Maximilian Martin, and Juan Luis Coderque Galligo. The report examined financial instruments aimed at narrowing the gap between humanitarian needs and available aid funding.

In April 2026, Farber and Patrick Reichert published the IMD report Risk Mitigation Strategies in Emerging & Frontier Markets, which examined de-risking tools for mobilizing private capital in developing economies.

== Bibliography ==
=== Books ===
- Farber, Vanina; Wuffli, Peter (2020). The elea Way: A Learning Journey Toward Sustainable Impact (1st ed.). London: Routledge. doi:10.4324/9781003094807. ISBN 978-0-367-55705-8.

=== Selected publications ===
- Bird, Matthew D.; Reichert, Patrick; Farber, Vanina (2025). "Risky business: Comparing the opportunity evaluation decisions of social and commercial entrepreneurs". Economics Letters. 256 112634. doi:10.1016/j.econlet.2025.112634.
- Hockerts, Kai; Hehenberger, Lisa; Schaltegger, Stefan; Farber, Vanina (2022). "Defining and conceptualizing impact investing: Attractive nuisance or catalyst?". Journal of Business Ethics. 179 (4): 937–950. doi:10.1007/s10551-022-05157-3.
- Reichert, Patrick; Bird, Matthew D.; Farber, Vanina (2021). "Gender and entrepreneurial propensity: Risk-taking and prosocial preferences in labour market entry decisions". Social Enterprise Journal. 17 (1): 111–139. doi:10.1108/SEJ-07-2020-0050.
- Klapper, Rita G.; Farber, Vanina A. (2016). "In Alain Gibb's footsteps: Evaluating alternative approaches to sustainable enterprise education". The International Journal of Management Education. 14 (3): 422–439. doi:10.1016/j.ijme.2016.09.001.
- Cardoza, Guillermo; Fornes, Gaston; Farber, Vanina; Gonzalez Duarte, Roberto; Ruiz Gutierrez, Jaime (2016). "Barriers and public policies affecting the international expansion of Latin American SMEs: Evidence from Brazil, Colombia, and Peru". Journal of Business Research. 69 (6): 2030–2039. doi:10.1016/j.jbusres.2015.10.148. hdl:1992/46927.

=== Book chapters ===
- Bacq, Sophie; Farber, Vanina; Reichert, Patrick (2024). "Models for Social Sustainability". In Binder, Julia; Haanaes, Knut (eds.). Leading the Sustainable Business Transformation: A Playbook from IMD. Wiley. pp. 101–112. ISBN 978-1-394-31407-2.
- Farber, Vanina; Reichert, Patrick (2023). "Brief History of Social Entrepreneurship, A: A Review and Avenues for Future Research". In Mitra, Jay (ed.). The Palgrave Encyclopedia of Entrepreneurship. Cham: Palgrave Macmillan. pp. 1–5. doi:10.1007/978-3-030-68128-9_6-1. ISBN 978-3-030-68128-9.
- Farber, Vanina; Reichert, Patrick (2023). "Blended Finance and the SDGs: Using the Spectrum of Capital to de-Risk Business Model Transformation". In Kacanski, Slobodan; Kabderian Dreyer, Johannes; Sund, Kristian J. (eds.). Measuring Sustainability and CSR: From Reporting to Decision-Making. Ethical Economy. Vol. 64. Cham: Springer. pp. 37–48. doi:10.1007/978-3-031-26959-2_5. ISBN 978-3-031-26958-5.
- Reichert, Patrick; Farber, Vanina (2022). "The Gender Inequality Index Through the Prism of Social Innovation". In Charles, Vincent; Emrouznejad, Ali (eds.). Modern Indices for International Economic Diplomacy. Cham: Palgrave Macmillan. pp. 85–120. doi:10.1007/978-3-030-84535-3_4.
- Farber, Vanina A.; Reichert, Patrick (2021). "Market Infrastructure for Social Ventures". In Lehner, Othmar M. (ed.). A Research Agenda for Social Finance. Cheltenham: Edward Elgar Publishing. pp. 79–98. doi:10.4337/9781789907964.00011. ISBN 978-1-78990-795-7.
- Widz, Marta; Farber, Vanina (2021). "GMA Garnet's Circular Economy: Jebsen & Jessen's Leadership in Environmental Sustainability". In Sharma, Pramodita; Sharma, Sanjay (eds.). Pioneering Family Firms' Sustainable Development Strategies. New Horizons in Sustainability and Business. Cheltenham: Edward Elgar Publishing. pp. 252–276. doi:10.4337/9781789904420.00017. ISBN 978-1-78990-442-0.
- Farber, Vanina A. (2014). "The Challenges of a Peruvian Inclusive State". In Mermod, Asli Yüksel; Idowu, Samuel O. (eds.). Corporate Social Responsibility in the Global Business World. Berlin; Heidelberg: Springer-Verlag. pp. 229–244. doi:10.1007/978-3-642-37620-7_13. ISBN 978-3-642-37620-7.
- Farber, Vanina A. (2009). "El impacto de la crisis en las economías emergentes". In Alarco, Germán (ed.). Crisis: Análisis y perspectivas de la crisis económica mundial desde el Perú. Lima: Norma. pp. 257–282. ISBN 978-9972-09-196-4.

== Awards and recognition ==
In 2024, Farber was named an AACSB Influential Leader in the "Community or Social Impact" category. Her teaching cases have won the EFMD Case Writing Competition in 2019 (Responsible Leadership, PMI's Vision of a Smoke-Free Future), 2022 (Responsible Leadership, Nia Impact Capital; African Business, Angaza), 2024 and 2025 (Responsible Business, Green or greenwashing? A 95 million dollar sustainability paradox for Michelin and BNP Paribas). She received The Case Centre's Outstanding Case Writer Award in 2022 and again in 2025.
