= Bintang Capital Partners =

Impact investment firm in Malaysia

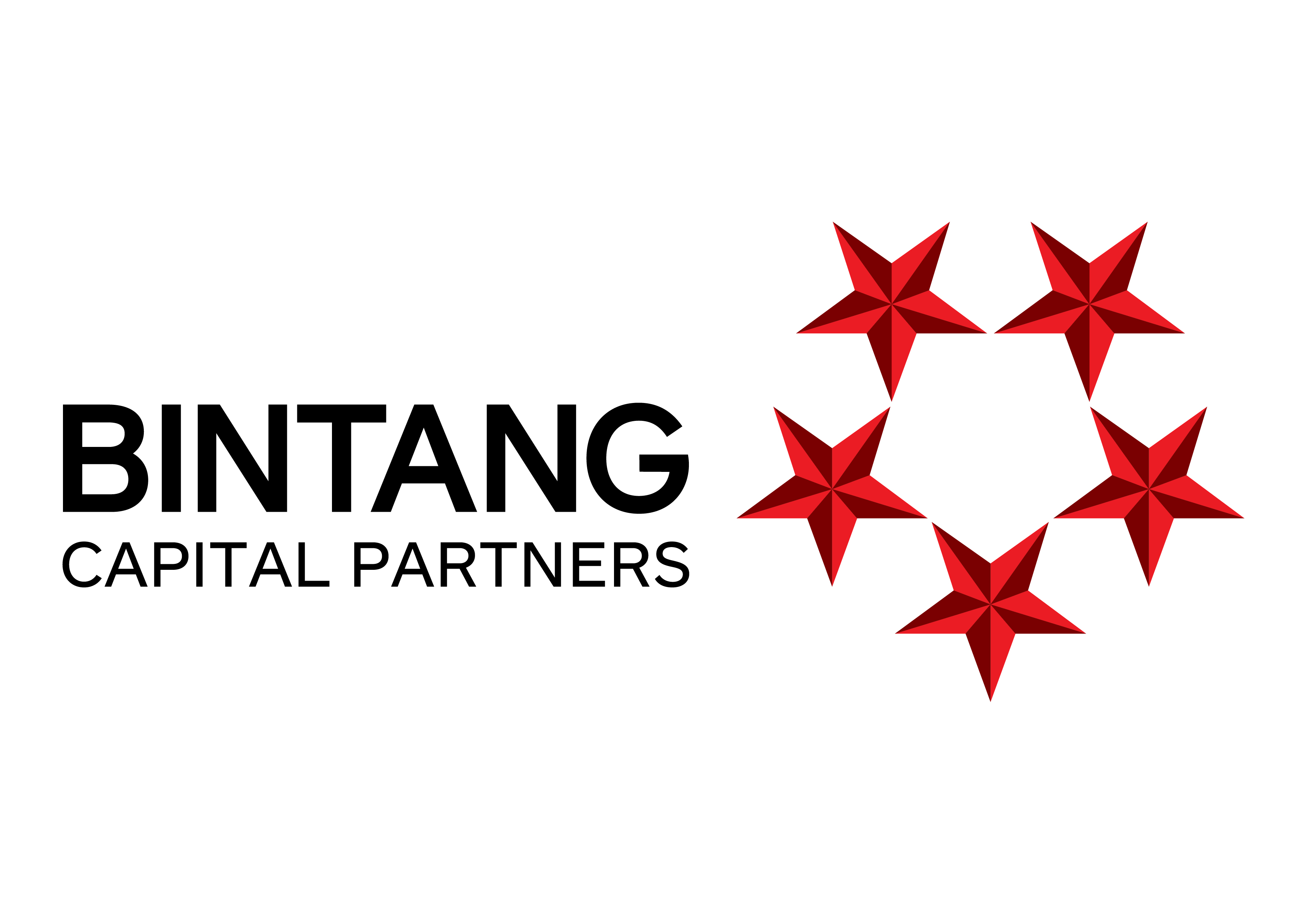
- Type: Subsidiary
- Industry: Impact Investing
- Founded: January 18, 2018; 8 years ago in Kuala Lumpur, Malaysia
- Founder: Johan Rozali-Wathooth
- Headquarters: Kuala Lumpur, Malaysia
- Key people: Johan Rozali-Wathooth (CEO); Adelene Low (CIO); Song Ee Rong (COO); Joseph Lee (CFO); Jacqueline See (Director)
- Services: Investments
- Website: bintangcapitalpartners.com

Bintang Capital Partners is a Malaysian impact investment firm headquartered in Kuala Lumpur.

== History ==
Bintang was founded in 2018 by Johan Rozali-Wathooth as a subsidiary of AHAM Asset Management, a leading Malaysian asset management company.

The firm made several special purpose vehicle investments between 2017-2021 including:

- Bitsmedia - a Singapore-headquartered mobile phone app developer which created Muslim Pro (an Islamic lifestyle app) and Qalbox (a Muslim lifestyle Subscription Video on Demand (SVoD) entertainment streaming service) (July 2017)
- The 1916 Company (previously known as WatchBox) - a Philadelphia, USA headquartered new and pre-loved luxury goods retail platform (May 2018)
- Oneberry Technologies - a Singapore-headquartered security technology solutions provider (September 2019; exited October 2023)
- iHandal Holdings - a Malaysian-headquartered industrial energy efficiency turnkey engineering business specialising in waste heat recovery (August 2021; exited March 2026)

In 2020, Bintang launched its maiden blind pool fund, BCP Asia Fund I which was anchored by Penjana Kapital (now part of Jelawang Capital, a subsidiary of Khazanah Nasional) under the Ministry of Finance Malaysia. The fund had its final close in 2022 and started deploying capital in the same year.

BCP Asia Fund I made several notable investments within the environmental and social themes, which included deployments into leading Malaysian elder care specialist Care Concierge, Singaporean-headquartered waste management firm Blue Planet, ASEAN digital marketing technology company Involve Asia, and Malaysian-Singaporean wellness chain Flow Studio. The fund's investment period ended in November 2024.

In 2024, Bintang launched the fundraising process for its sequel blind pool funds: general impact fund BCP Asia Fund II and gender lens focused Bintang Semiconductor Impact Fund I. Bintang's sequel funds have secured a "Gold" rating under leading global provider of impact intelligence and independent verification Bluemark's FundID rating system.

Since its founding, Bintang has achieved several milestones as an impact investor including becoming one of the earliest Malaysian private sector signatories to the United Nations Principles for Responsible Investment in 2021 and the first Malaysian signatory to the Global Impact Investing Network's Operating Principles for Impact Management in 2022.

A key aspect of Bintang's impact investment Theory of Change is the propagation of B Corp companies within its geographic mandate. Bintang became the first Southeast Asian private equity firm to secure B Corp Certification in 2023 whilst several Bintang portfolio companies have also secured B Corp certification including Involve Asia, Care Concierge and Bitsmedia.

== Recognition ==
Bintang has received international recognition for its impact investments.

In 2023, Bintang secured the Innovative Investment Prize at the ASEAN Business Advisory Council awards as well as the Global SME of the Year prize at the Environmental Finance Sustainable Companies Awards.

In 2024, the firm became the first Southeast Asian firm to win the Private Markets special award at the United Nations Principles for Responsible Investment 2024 Awards and also won the 2024 Malaysian United Nations Women's Empowerment Principles' award for Innovative Financing for Gender Equality.

In 2025, Bintang became the first Malaysian firm to win the Asian Venture Capital Journal (AVCJ) Responsible Investment award for its investment into Care Concierge.
