= Ruth Shaber =

American businesswoman

Ruth Shaber is an American physician, philanthropist, and author. She is the founder and president of the Tara Health Foundation, a private foundation focused on gender, economic, and racial justice, and the co-founder and board chair of Rhia Ventures, a nonprofit organization dedicated to advancing reproductive and maternal health equity. She was named to the Forbes Impact 50 list in 2020.

== Early life and education ==
Shaber graduated from Yale University with a Bachelor of Arts in chemistry in 1982. She received her MD from the Perelman School of Medicine at the University of Pennsylvania in 1986 and completed her residency in obstetrics and gynecology at the University of California, San Francisco.

== Medical career ==
In 1990, Shaber joined Kaiser Permanente South San Francisco Medical Center as an obstetrician and gynecologist. Over her 22-year career at Kaiser Permanente, she held several leadership positions, including chief of obstetrics and gynecology (1997–2003), director of women's health for the Northern California division, and founder of the Women's Health Research Institute in Kaiser Permanente's Northern California region. From 2007 to 2012, she served as medical director of the Kaiser Permanente Care Management Institute, where she oversaw evidence-based medicine programs that translated medical research into clinical practice across Kaiser Permanente's regional and national systems.

== Philanthropy and impact investing ==
=== Tara Health Foundation ===
In 2014, Shaber founded the Tara Health Foundation, a private foundation initially focused on improving the health and well-being of women and girls through the creative use of philanthropic capital. The foundation was structured as a spend-down, intending to distribute all of its assets by 2030 rather than operate in perpetuity.

From the outset, the foundation committed to aligning 100 percent of its assets—including grants, direct investments, and public market investments—with its mission, applying a gender lens investing framework across all asset classes as part of a broader impact investing strategy. To support this strategy, Tara Health funded research to develop new tools for gender lens investing, including collaborations with the University of Pennsylvania's Center for High Impact Philanthropy and the Wharton School Social Impact Initiative.

In 2021, the foundation revised its mission to focus on health and economic justice at the intersection of race and gender. As of 2025, the foundation had deployed over $100 million in grants, investments, and debt toward its mission and was on track to complete its planned spend-down by the end of the decade.

=== Rhia Ventures ===
In 2018, Shaber co-founded the Reproductive Health Investors Alliance, later known as Rhia Ventures, as an initiative incubated within the Tara Health Foundation. Rhia Ventures is a nonprofit organization dedicated to advancing reproductive and maternal health equity through research, corporate engagement, impact investment, and communications. Its wholly owned investment subsidiary, RH Capital, was among the first venture capital funds focused on women's health. Tara Health contributed approximately $1.5 million to build organizational infrastructure and served as an anchor investor with $5 million; the first fund closed at $38 million. RH Capital grew to a portfolio of more than 20 early-stage companies and $43.5 million in assets under management across two funds. Shaber serves as board chair of Rhia Ventures.

== Publications ==
- Marime-Ball, Patience and Ruth Shaber. The XX Edge: Unlocking Higher Returns and Lower Risk. Simon & Schuster, 2022. ISBN 978-1637630938.
