= Pulse Impact Investing Management Software =

Software platform

Pulse Impact Investing Management Software was a software platform that was available free to non-profit companies and designed to help organizations better demonstrate impact.

Pulse was designed to track financial, operational, social and environmental metrics, and featured a range of qualitative reporting to complement quantitative performance management data. It allowed organizations to aggregate and benchmark financial, operating, social and environmental performance metrics at the portfolio and sector level, allowing for meaningful comparisons of performance against a relevant peer group.

On September 30, 2013, Acumen Fund and B Lab announced Pulse would be integrated into the B Analytics platform and no longer offered on a standalone basis.

== History ==
Pulse was developed by Acumen Fund, who, in 2006, recognized the need to standardize the metrics that social investors track to benchmark and better understand the impact of one social investor versus another. Acumen Fund recruited volunteer engineers from Google to build a prototype portfolio management system, and from this work, a system called PDMS (Portfolio Data Management System) was launched. Google's charitable arm Google.org started using PDMS soon after, and PDMS was exhibited at the 2006 ANDE (Aspen Network of Development Professionals) annual conference.

In 2007 and 2008, PDMS continued to gain industry acceptance as the formal beta test was launched with more flexibility and features. In 2008, Acumen Fund and the developers of PDMS decided to move the system onto the Salesforce.com platform. Concurrently, Acumen Fund engaged The Rockefeller Foundation, PricewaterhouseCoopers, Deloitte, Global Impact Investing Network, Hitachi, and B-Lab to develop the standard taxonomy that PDMS would use, which was dubbed IRIS (Impact Reporting and Investment Standards). The new system, built on the Salesforce.com platform and incorporating the new IRIS standards, was renamed Pulse.
