= Gender lens investing =

Gender lens investing (also known as gender-smart investing or gender finance) is the practice of investing premised on the understanding that gender is material to financial, business, and social outcomes The term was coined around 2009 and became an increasingly popular practice in the mid-2010s as part of reducing gender inequality.

Gender lens investing can include funding woman-owned businesses, businesses with a strong track record of employing women, or companies that improve the lives of women and girls with their products and services. Sarah Kaplan of the Rotman School of Management and Jackie VanderBrug of U.S. Trust wrote of the practice that "Women launching and expanding ventures around the world have an estimated collective credit gap of $320 billion (the difference between the capital they are seeking and the credit to which they have access), which creates a major opportunity for investors."

== Approaches ==
Gender lens investing is commonly described in terms of three lenses, a framing set out by Sarah Kaplan and Jackie VanderBrug in 2014: increasing women's access to capital, whether as entrepreneurs or as investors; promoting workplace equity in investee companies; and financing products and services that benefit women and girls. Practitioners have since added further lenses, including gender equity in supply chains and the role of women as investors.

Academic analysis has distinguished several competing rationales within the field. A 2026 study in New Political Economy identified three narratives — a firm-oriented case that gender diversity improves corporate performance, a development case centred on women's economic empowerment in emerging markets, and a more radical strand that seeks to change how capital is allocated — and found that the market is dominated by public money and institutional investors rather than by private or retail capital.

== History ==
The practice of using investment to advance gender equality dates back to the 1970s, with the creation of initiatives such as Women's World Banking and Muhammad Yunus’s Grameen Bank, which granted small loans to mostly women business owners in the Global South to facilitate their economic empowerment.

Gender lens investing emerged as a more defined field in the 2000s and 2010s, when a group of investors and field builders – including Joy Anderson of the think tank Criterion Institute, Suzanne Biegel of Women Effect and later GenderSmart, and Jackie VanderBrug, co-author of the book Gender Lens Investing: Uncovering Opportunities for Growth, Returns, and Impact – began to work together to grow the portion of capital invested in women founders, and moved by women investors. In March 2018, several development finance institutions (DFIs) hosted by CDC Group (now British International Investment) came together as the Gender Finance Collaborative, created to leverage the combined capital, capacity, networks, and knowledge to advance gender lens investing. This expanded the gender lens approach beyond its initial North American base, to include actors in Europe, Africa, and Asia. In July 2021, the Gender Finance Collaborative merged with the 2X Challenge to become the 2X Collaborative.

Early examples of gender lens investing in mainstream finance include the Valeurs Feminines fund in France, created by the French money-management firm Conseil Plus Gestion in 2005 to invest in women-owned and women-led European businesses

As of June 2023, the market size of gender lens investments in private markets is estimated at $7.9 billion USD. The total assets under management of publicly traded gender lens equity funds is estimated at $4.27 billion USA, with 44 equity funds specifically focused on gender lens investing available for public investment.

Despite some growth in gender lens investors in Asia, MENA, and Latin America, gender investment firms continue to largely be based in North America and Europe. As of 2024, 47% of gender lens investors are headquartered in the US and Canada and 27% are based in Western, Northern, and Southern Europe.

== Frameworks and initiatives ==
=== 2X Challenge ===
The 2X Challenge was announced at the 2018 G7 summit in Canada as a commitment by the G7 development finance institutions to mobilise US$3 billion in gender lens investment by the end of 2020. The initiative reported that more than US$11 billion was raised. A second round announced at the 2021 G7 summit set a US$15 billion target for 2021–2022, against which the initiative reported approximately US$16 billion; a third round announced at the 2024 G7 summit in Italy set a US$20 billion target for 2024–2027 and opened participation to private-sector investors. The initiative reported cumulative mobilisation of about US$34 billion between 2018 and 2023.

Qualifying investments are assessed against the 2X Criteria, which set thresholds for women's ownership or founding of a business, representation in leadership, share of employment, supply-chain participation, and products or services directed at women, together with an indirect criterion for funds and financial intermediaries. The criteria were revised in February 2024.

=== Other initiatives ===
In the United Kingdom, the Investing in Women Code was established in 2019 on the recommendation of the Rose Review of Female Entrepreneurship, with 12 founding signatories, rising to more than 300 by 2026. Signatory investors and lenders report data on the gender of the founders they finance to the Department for Business and Trade, whose sixth annual report found that businesses with at least one female founder received 32% of signatories' venture capital investment in 2025, against 15% market-wide.

Project Sage, a survey of private-market gender lens funds produced by the Wharton Social Impact Initiative at the University of Pennsylvania, counted 58 funds in its first edition in 2017 and 206 in its fourth in 2021. Japan's Government Pension Investment Fund has allocated to gender diversity indexes since December 2020, adding a domestic mandate of approximately US$3.7 billion in 2023.

In fixed income, the Women's Livelihood Bond series structured by the Singapore-based Impact Investment Exchange was the first impact investing bond listed on a public stock exchange, beginning with a US$8 million issue on the Singapore Exchange in 2017.

=== Public market funds ===
The first US exchange-traded fund built around gender diversity, launched by State Street Global Advisors in March 2016 under the ticker SHE, tracked large companies ranked within their sectors by the share of women on their boards and in senior leadership. The California State Teachers' Retirement System provided US$250 million at launch and accounted for almost all of the fund's inflows in its first year. The fund, later renamed the SPDR MSCI USA Gender Diversity ETF, was promoted by the Fearless Girl statue installed in Manhattan in 2017.

Assets in gender-focused bonds were estimated at US$62.4 billion as of September 2025 by Parallelle Finance, a research firm that tracks the sector under its own classification.

== Financial returns ==
Supporters of gender lens investing argue that firms with a higher-than-average proportion of women in executive roles tend to perform well, possibly because of an increased diversity of viewpoints or because not discriminating against women allows companies to hire the best available talent. Business Insider wrote of gender lens investing in 2015 that "It is a proven theory as most of the women-focused funds and investment strategies – a tiny slice of the $6.6 trillion-socially responsible investing world – have been standout performers over the years." A survey of gender lens investors conducted in 2024 by the Global Impact Investing Network found that 77% gender investments fell largely in line with their financial expectations, 13% outperformed expectations, and 8% underperformed.

A Review commissioned by the UK Treasury found that supporting female entrepreneurs could generate as much as £250 billion for the UK economy. Businesses run by women were less likely, the report found, to deliver a turnover of more than £1bn. Supporting entrepreneurs would help to close this gap.

Critics of gender-lens investing argue that it asks investors to give up some of the returns they could expect from a gender-neutral investment strategy. Joann Weiner of the Washington Post wrote skeptically of the strategy's ability to deliver above average returns: "Like all the rest, the 'gender lens' strategy will have its good times, and it will have its hard times. Follow a 'gender lens' investment strategy if it makes you feel good. Just don’t count on making a killing in the market if you do."

== See also ==
- Environmental, social, and governance (ESG) investing
- Sustainable finance
- Minority business enterprise
- Gender representation on corporate boards of directors
- Economic inequality
