= Pollution prevention =

Content related to Pollution prevention may be found at, for example:

- Pollution – Control
- Water pollution – Control and reduction
- Air pollution – Reduction and regulation
- Plastic pollution – Reduction efforts
- Litter – Reduction and regulation

== Related concepts and processes ==
- Circular economy
- Dust (particulate) control
- Remanufacturing
- Source reduction
- Sustainable packaging
- Toxics use reduction
- Waste minimisation

== By location ==
- Pollution prevention in the United States
- Pollution Prevention Act of 1990
