= Joann Weiner =

American professor

- Education: Harvard University; University of California, Berkeley
- Scientific career
- Fields: Economics
- Workplaces: George Washington University

Joann Weiner is an associate professor of economics at George Washington University in the Columbian College of Arts and Sciences.

== Education ==
Weiner earned a Bachelor of Science from the University of California, Berkeley. Weiner earned an M.A. and Ph.D. from Harvard University.

== Work ==
Joann Weiner frequently has articles published in the Washington Post. She has also written for Bloomberg Government.

Joann Weiner is the director of the MS in Applied Economics program at The George Washington University.
