= Impact investing =

Investing for socio-environmental impact and profit

Impact investing are investments "made into companies, organizations, and funds with the intention to generate a measurable, beneficial social or environmental impact alongside a financial return". At its core, impact investing is about an alignment of an investor's beliefs and values with the allocation of capital to address social and/or environmental issues.

Impact investors actively seek to place capital in businesses, nonprofits, and funds in industries such as renewable energy, education, and microfinance. Institutional investors, notably North American and European development finance institutions, pension funds and endowments have played a leading role in the development of impact investing. Under Pope Francis, the Catholic Church saw an increased interest in impact investing.

Impact investing occurs across asset classes; for example, private equity/venture capital, debt, and fixed income. Impact investments can be made in either emerging or developed markets, and depending on the goals of the investors, can "target a range of returns from below-market to above-market rates".

== Development ==
Historically, regulation—and to a lesser extent, philanthropy—was an attempt to minimize the negative social consequences (unintended consequences, externalities) of business activities. However, a history of individual investors using socially responsible investing to express their values exists, and such investing behavior is usually defined by the avoidance of investments in specific companies or activities with negative effects.

Simultaneously, approaches such as pollution prevention, corporate social responsibility, and triple bottom line began as measurements of non-financial effects, both inside and outside of corporations. In 2000, Baruch Lev of the NYU's Stern School of Business collated thinking about intangible assets in a book of the same name, which furthered thinking about the non-financial effects of corporate production.

The term "impact investing" was coined in 2005 by Mark Zapletal of Wartenberg Trust in his presentation "Impact Investing, a Door to Sustainable Philanthropy", at the Global Family Office Summit in New York.

Modern impact investing funds grew prominent shortly after the Great Recession as mechanisms for socially responsible investing. They aim to combine philanthropic, public, and private wealth, to generate social or environmental impact alongside traditional financial return.

Scholars have suggested that the emergence of impact investing after the crisis may have been attributed to broader critiques of financial institutions, and profit-maximization models. From this perspective, impact investing reflected efforts to incorporate social outcomes into private capital allocation decisions.

Following the adoption of the United Nations' (UN) Sustainable Development Goals (SDGs) in late 2015, many firms began to align themselves towards the outlined framework. The goals require an estimated $5–7 trillion of annual investment, the majority of which is expected to derive from private capital. As a result, impact investors aimed to address the required capital gap, linking their funds to the goals.

By the 2020s, impact investing has spread across numerous financial industries, like private equity, private credit, and venture capital. Dedicated asset management firms have launched funds focusing on addressing specific goals, like environmental, poverty, and discrimination issues.

== Industry ==
As of 2024, the number of funds engaged in impact investing is estimated at 3,907 organizations managing an estimated $1.571 trillion USD in impact assets under management, much smaller than the global equity market ($78 trillion USD). A 2024 report from the Global Impact Investing Network (GIIN) estimated that the impact investing industry grew at a 21% compound annual growth rate since 2019. The largest sectors by asset allocation were identified as energy, housing, financial services (including microfinance), and healthcare.

Impact investing is distinguished from crowdfunding sites, such as Indiegogo or Kickstarter, because impact investments are typically debt or equity investments over US$1,000—with longer-than-traditional venture capital payment times—and an "exit strategy" (traditionally an initial public offering (IPO) or buyout in the for-profit startup sector) may be non-existent. Although some social enterprises are nonprofits, impact investing typically involves for-profit, social- or environmental-mission-driven businesses.

Organizations receiving impact investment capital may be set up legally as a for-profit, not-for profit, benefit corporation, low-profit limited liability company (L3C), community interest company, or other designations that may vary by country. In much of Europe, these are known as "social enterprises".

Impact investing funds seek to generate both a social return and a financial return. Research examining existing funds has found that many investors may accept an expected return of 2-4 percentage points lower on their expected return. Therefore, some investors may be willing to trade a portion of their financial return to see a measurable social impact. The amount investors are willing to sacrifice may be higher in funds that focus on environmental impacts, and lower in other categories.

== Institutional impact investing ==
=== Institutional investors ===
Impact investments occur across asset classes and investment amounts. Among the best-known mechanism is private equity or venture capital. "Social venture capital", or "patient capital", impact investments are structured similarly to those in the rest of the venture capital community. Investors may take an active role mentoring or leading the growth of the company, similar to the way a venture capital firm assists in the growth of an early-stage company. Hedge funds and private equity funds may also pursue impact investing strategies.

Impact investment "accelerators" also exist for seed- and growth-stage social enterprises. Similar to seed-stage accelerators for traditional startups, impact investment accelerators provide smaller amounts of capital than Series A financings or larger impact investment deals. Most "impact investment accelerators" are nonprofits, raising grants from donors to pay for business development services; however, commercially orientated accelerators providing investment readiness and capital-raising advisory services are emerging.

Large corporations are also emerging as powerful mechanisms for impact investing. Companies that seek to create shared value through developing new products/services, or positively impacting their operations, are beginning to employ impact investments through their value chain, particularly their supply chain.

Impact investing can help organizations become self-sufficient by enabling them to carry out their projects and initiatives without having to rely heavily on donations and state subsidies.

There has been a growing interest in impact investing from faith-based investors, as they seek to align their investments with their core beliefs.

=== Increased supranational and pension cooperation ===
Governments and national and international public institutions including development finance institutions have sought to leverage their impact-oriented policies by encouraging pension funds and other large asset owners to co-invest with them in impact-informed assets and projects, notably in the Global South. World Pensions Council and other US and European experts have welcome this course of action, insisting nonetheless that:

Governments and international institutions need to do more if they truly seek to 'unlock' private sector capital in a meaningful way. They have to ask themselves the following questions: what are the concrete legal, regulatory, financial and fiduciary concerns facing pension fund board members? How can we improve emerging industry standards for impact measurement and help pension trustees steer more long-term capital towards valuable economic endeavors at home and abroad, while, simultaneously, ensuring fair risk-adjusted returns for future pensioners?

=== Mission investing by foundations ===
Mission investments are investments made by foundations and other mission-based organizations to further their philanthropic goals, either with a portion or with the entirety of their endowment. They include any type of investment that is intended and designed to generate both a measurable social or environmental benefit and a financial return. For example, after the Heron Foundation's internal audit of its investments in 2011 uncovered an investment in a private prison that was directly contrary to the foundation's mission, the foundation developed and then began to advocate for a four-part ethical framework to endowment investments conceptualized as Human Capital, Natural Capital, Civic Capital, and Financial Capital.

Foundations that make investments aligned with related philanthropic work include the Bill & Melinda Gates Foundation, Soros Economic Development Fund, and Ford Foundation.

==== Program-related investments (PRIs) ====
Program-related investments (PRIs) are investments, usually by foundations, into below-market rate or concessionary investments that are primarily made to achieve charitable or "programmatic" objectives rather than financial objectives. This category includes recoverable grants, below-market-rate loans, R&D or seed stage equity investments (stock), loan guarantees and volume guarantees. For private foundations, PRIs count towards the required 5 percent annual payout.

==== Mission-related investments (MRIs) ====
Mission-related investments (MRIs) are investments, generally made from endowments, into mission-driven organizations that are expected to generate market-rate financial returns comparable to an ordinary investment of a similar type and risk profile. MRIs are designed to have both a positive social impact and contribute to the endowment's long-term financial stability and growth. Examples of MRIs include loans to mission-aligned non-profit organizations (e.g., charter schools, hospitals or research centers) that are expected to pay back loans with interest, as well as investments in for-profit social impact companies, social impact funds, socially responsible fixed income (bond) funds, impact-oriented private equity funds and public equity portfolios (stocks).

== Impact investing by individuals ==
Impact investing historically took place through mechanisms aimed at institutional investors. However, there are ways for individuals to participate in providing early stage or growth funding to such ventures.

=== Exchange-traded funds ===
Exchange-traded funds like the SPDR Gender Diversity ETF from State Street are publicly traded and hence available to anyone with a stock brokerage account. MSCI offers 11 environmental, social and governance index ETFs, including popular low-carbon and sustainability indexes.

=== Syndicate or pooled investing ===
Groups of angel investors focused on impact, where individuals invest as a syndicate also exist. Examples include Clearly Social Angels in the United Kingdom.

=== Digital microfinance platforms ===
Web-based investing platforms, which offer lower-cost investing services, also exist. As equity deals can be prohibitively expensive for small-scale transactions, microfinance loans, rather than equity investment, are prevalent in these platforms. MyC4, founded in 2006, allowed retail investors to loan to small businesses in African countries via local intermediaries, though the service permanently closed in 2019. Microplace was an early United States provider of such services which ceased taking on new loans in 2014, stating that its results "haven't scaled to the widespread social impact we aspire to achieve".

=== Impact investing in Asia ===
Impact Investing in Asia is a burgeoning sector with many funds currently in play. In South East Asia, from 2007 to 2017, US$904 million impact capital was deployed by Private Impact Investors (PIIs) and US$11.9 million was deployed by Development Finance Institutions (DFIs).

== Private equity and venture capital ==
Impact investing organizations and funds also make equity investments like traditional private equity and venture capital funds, but only investments with developmental impact. According to a 2021 study by the Wharton School of the University of Pennsylvania venture capital has been dominating the impact investment space.

== Gender lens investing ==
Gender lens investing is a subsection of Impact Investing, and refers to investments which are "made into companies, organizations, and funds with the explicit intent to create a positive impact on gender". Investments which promote gender equity and address gender based issues can be made by investing in gender led enterprises, enterprises which promote gender equality through hiring, women in positions of authority, or in their supply chain, as well as supporting services which support, empower and develop capacity of women. Gender lens investing was created in response to the difficulty which woman face in accessing capital, as women globally have less access and higher barriers to obtaining capital.

Female entrepreneurs have routinely struggled to attract capital from male investors. In 2019 Fortune magazine reported that just 2.2% of all venture capital went to female founders. Taken together, all female founders raised less in capital than one e-cigarette manufacturer. Some have gone to great lengths to avoid experiencing gender discrimination. In 2017 the Telegraph reported on the founders of Witchsy who created an imaginary third male founder in order to converse with male investors.

Gender lens investing is growing rapidly. More than 100 funds are open to private investors. In 2018 the number of gender lens assets under management grow by 40% according to analysis by Veris Wealth Partners. Demand is rising with major banks offering gender lens bonds including NAG, Goldman Sachs, Merrill Lynch and many others.

== Environmental Investing ==
Environmental Investing is a subsection of Impact Impacting, and refers to investments made into companies or groups that have the intent to generate a measurable, positive environmental impact along with traditional financial returns. Investments that address climate change can be made by funding projects like clean energy generation, public transportation infrastructure, sustainable water management, and others. Environmental investing was created in recognition that immense private capital is required to address environmental issues, particularly climate change.

Environmental Investing has grown rapidly over the past couple decades. The Green Bond market, the most prominent instrument in the field, was created by World Bank in 2008 in response to the Great Recession. By 2024, the Green Bond market had reached a total cumulative issuance of ~$700 billion, and total issuance of all sustainability-related bonds had grown to nearly $8 trillion. Demand had existed in both private and public capital markets.

== See also ==
- Effective altruism
- Double bottom line
- Financial inclusion
- Social business
- Social finance
- Social return on investment
- Socially responsible investing
