= Global Impact Investing Network =

American non-profit

The Global Impact Investing Network
- Type: Nonprofit organization
- Predecessor: Rockefeller Impact Investing Collaborative
- Founded: September 2009; 16 years ago in New York City
- Founders: Amit Bouri and Antony Bugg-Levine
- Headquarters: New York, NY, United States
- Revenue: 16,484,237 United States dollar (2022)
- Total assets: 16,968,824 United States dollar (2022)
- Website: thegiin.org

The Global Impact Investing Network (GIIN) is a non-profit organization based in New York City. Its stated mission focuses on increasing the scale, effectiveness and professionalization of impact investing globally.

The GIIN hosts multiple yearly conferences of impact investing professionals as well as convenings for members. The GIIN also conducts research on the impact investing market and emerging trends within the industry, including market sizing, demographics, investment performance, and impact measurement and management. The organization also serves as the host for both the IRIS+ impact measurement system and the Operating Principles for Impact Management (OPIM).

As of June 2025, 421 companies are GIIN members and include large asset management firms, sovereign wealth funds, family offices, pension funds, insurance companies, and other types of financial organizations around the world.

== History ==
The GIIN began as a Rockefeller Foundation sponsored project following two meetings of the Rockefeller Impact Investing Collaborative at the Foundation’s Bellagio Center in 2007 and 2008. Attendees of the meetings included early impact investors, philanthropists, and financial experts and were convened by Antony Bugg-Levine, then program director of the Foundation. According to Bugg-Levine, the meetings’ goals were to form and launch a network of philanthropists, institutional investors, and entrepreneurs interested in collaborative efforts to provide capital for social problem-solving. The Rockefeller Center established the Global Impact Investing Network as a non-profit organization with its own leadership and staff in order to formalize this network and the Impact Reporting and Investment Standards (IRIS) as a metrics systems to standardize impact measurement practices.

While the Rockefeller Foundation remains a GIIN member, its President, Judith Rodin, is still listed by the GIIN as director emerita and Bugg-Levine remains a board member of the GIIN, the Foundation no longer has other institutional affiliations with the GIIN and has closed its impact investing practice as of 2013.

The GIIN was co-founded by Amit Bouri and Antony Bugg-Levine in 2009 and was first publicly unveiled on September 25, 2009 by former President Bill Clinton at the Clinton Global Initiative in New York City with financial support commitments from the Rockefeller Foundation, J.P. Morgan, and USAID.

Bouri was named as managing director of the GIIN in 2009. In 2011, Luther M. Ragin, Jr was named CEO. In 2015, Bouri succeeded Ragin as CEO and President. Sapna Shah was named President in 2024, while Bouri continues to remain CEO.

In 2019, the GIIN launched IRIS+ as an impact investment planning tool and individual website for users to explore and export relevant impact data standards from IRIS.

== IRIS/IRIS+ ==
The Impact Reporting and Investment Standards (IRIS) is a catalogue of indicators and performance metrics managed by the GIIN. It is used by impact investors to measure the financial, operational, environmental or social performance of impact investments. IRIS was developed in 2008 with support from Acumen and B Lab and launched alongside the GIIN in 2009.

In 2019, the GIIN announced the release of IRIS+, a revision of the catalogue that integrates previously existing metric sets, including the UN Sustainable Development Goals, into its system. It is managed by the GIIN as a public good.

== Operating Principles for Impact Management ==
The Operating Principles for Impact Management, known collectively as the “Impact Principles,” are a set of market standards and principles managed by a general secretariat that defines what constitutes an impact investment or an impact investor. The Impact Principles were developed in 2019 by the International Finance Corporation and a collective of 60 impact investors managing an estimated $350 billion in assets under management dedicated solely to impact investing. As of March 2025, 186 companies across 40 countries are signatories to the Impact Principles.

Signatories to the Impact Principles are required to submit an annual disclosure to the secretariat on their integration of the principles into their investment practice. These disclosures are then made publicly available after review.

In 2022, the IFC transferred hosting of the secretariat to the GIIN. Joohee Rand currently serves as director of the Impact Principles’ secretariat.
