= DPD =

The abbreviation DPD may stand for:

== Computing ==
- Dead Peer Detection, an IPSec VPN feature
- Delegated Path Discovery, a public-key query method
- Densely packed decimal, a system of binary encoding for decimal digits

== Engineering and technology ==
- Dew point depression
- Diffusion pressure deficit
- Digital pre-distortion, a subset of multidimensional digital pre-distortion that deals with linearization of non-orthogonal, non-linear systems.
- Digital product definition, a near-synonym of model-based definition
- Dissipative particle dynamics, a mesoscopic particle-based materials simulation technique
- Diver propulsion device, an underwater vehicle

== Law ==
- EU Dangerous Preparations Directive
- EU Data Protection Directive
- Development Plan Document, in town and country planning in England and Wales
- Digital Phonorecord Delivery, a U.S. Copyright Office process for sound recording registration
- Denver Police Department, Colorado
- Detroit Police Department, Michigan
- Dallas Police Department, Texas

== Mental disorders ==
- Dependent personality disorder, over-dependence on others
- Depersonalization-derealization disorder, feeling detached from one's self
- Depressive personality disorder, disorder with depressive features

== Organic chemicals ==
- Dihydropyrimidine dehydrogenase, an enzyme
- N,N-diethyl-p-phenylenediamine, a phenylenediamine often used to determine chlorine in water

== Politics ==
- Democratic Party of Germany (German: Demokratische Partei Deutschlands), liberal party in Germany
- Regional Representative Council (Indonesian: Dewan Perwakilan Daerah), a chamber of the Indonesian parliament

== Other uses ==
- DPD, a subsidiary of international parcel-delivery business Geopost
- Diccionario panhispánico de dudas (Pan-Hispanic Dictionary of Doubts), Spanish lexicon
- Distributed participatory design
- Dorking Deepdene railway station, England (GBR code: DPD)
