= Inverted Brayton cycle =

Inverted Brayton Cycle (IBC) (also known as Subatmospheric Brayton cycle) is another version of the conventional Brayton cycle but with a turbine positioned immediately in the inlet of the system.

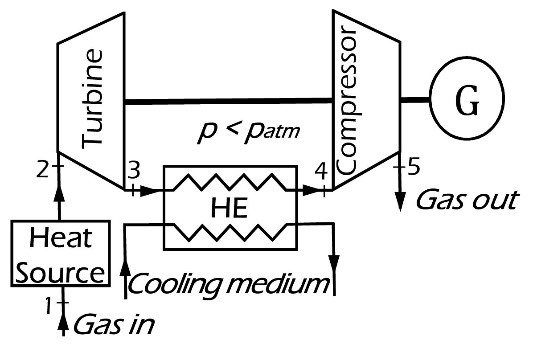
Figure 1. Inverted Brayton cycle basic scheme (1–2) – heat addition; (2–3) – turbine expansion; (3–4) – cooling; (4–5) – compression; (5–6) – release to atmosphere

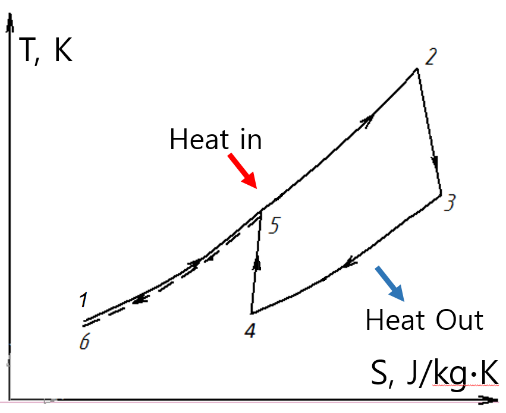
Figure 2. T-S diagram of inverted Brayton cycle (1–2) – heat addition; (2–3) – turbine expansion; (3–4) – cooling; (4–5) – compression; (5–6) – release to atmosphere

== Functionality ==
Incoming air may be heated up in the combustion chamber, in the heat exchanger, or the system may directly receive hot exhaust gas from an engine or some technological process. Been heated up in one of these ways, the gas expands in the turbine from pressure around the atmospheric to the subatmospheric one, after the turbine, created by the compressor located further in the gas duct. The gas should be cooled down in the heat-exchanger between the turbine and compressor to provide the difference in the work received in the turbine and the work needed for the compressor to maintain the subatmospheric pressure after the turbine. After the compressor, the gas is released to the atmosphere with the pressure close to the atmospheric one. Alternatively, the gas can be cooled down after the compressor again, as it gains some heat in the compression process, and then released. The heat received in the heat-exchangers between the turbine and compressor and after the compressor may be used for heating, providing the cogeneration mode of the system operation. The basic scheme of the IBC and temperature-enthalpy diagram are presented in figures 1 and 2. For external heat sources or high temperature storage systems, the closed process design of the inverted Brayton Cycle is also possible. The overall efficiency can thus be significantly increased.
