= Dust collector =

Industrial machine

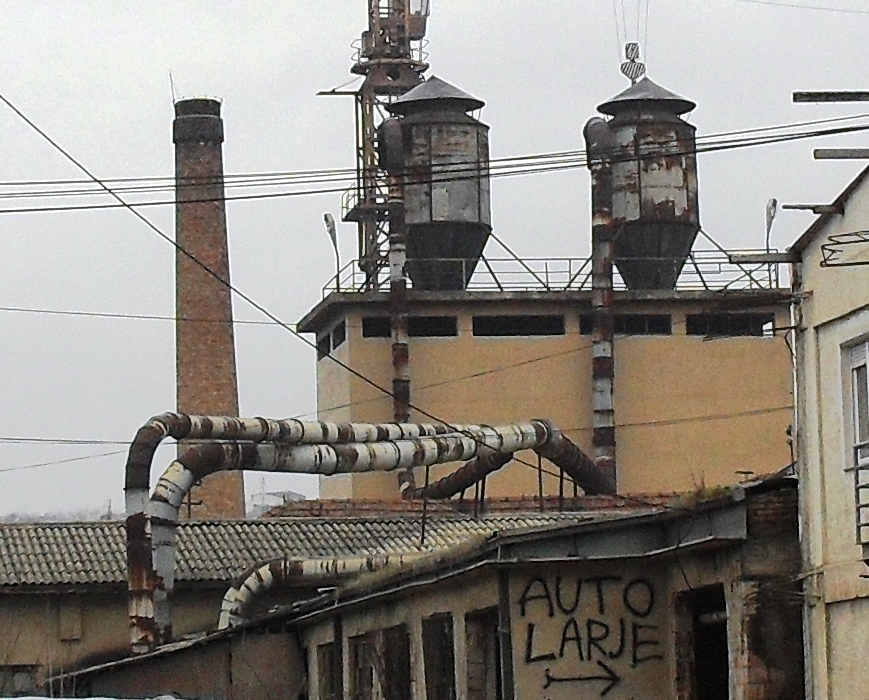
Two rooftop dust collectors in Pristina, Kosovo

A dust collector is a system used to enhance the quality of air released from industrial and commercial processes by collecting dust particle and other impurities from air or gas. Designed to handle high-volume dust loads, a dust collector system consists of a blower, dust filter, a filter-cleaning system, and a dust receptacle or dust removal system. It is distinguished from air purifiers, which use disposable filters to remove dust.

== History ==
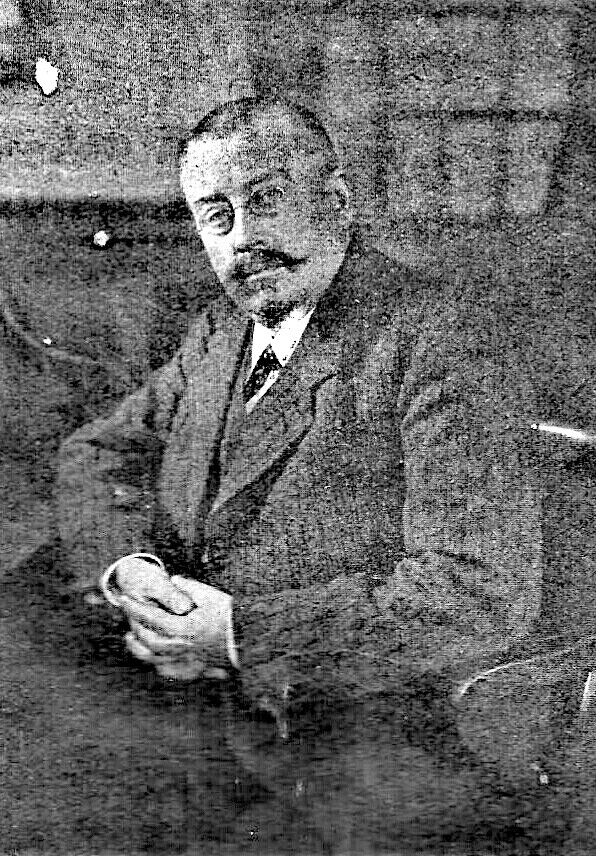
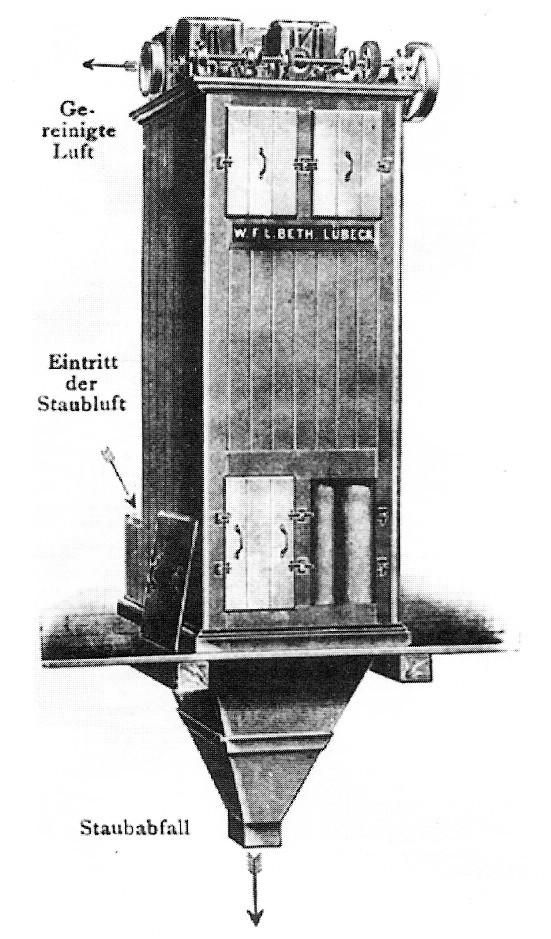
Left, Wilhelm Beth. Right,"Beth"-Filter "KS" (1910)

The father of the dust collector was Wilhelm Beth from Lübeck, a grinding mill engineer. In 1886, he was granted Patent No. 38396 for a “Suction Hose Filter with Automatic Cleaning Action". He invented particle collection systems to counter the dust produced by industrial machinery in the late 19th century. This was accomplished by creating a vacuum system to filter particles to capture dust. In 1887, Beth founded WFL Beth Maschinenfabrik, which became a global pioneer in the capturing of airborne particles.

In 1921, he patented three filter designs that he had pioneered to remove dust from air.

== Uses ==
Dust collectors are used in many processes to either recover valuable granular solid or powder from process streams, or to remove granular solid pollutants from exhaust gases prior to venting to the atmosphere. Dust collection is an online process for collecting any process-generated dust from the source point on a continuous basis. Dust collectors may be of single unit construction, or a collection of devices used to separate particulate matter from the process air. They are often used as an air pollution control device to maintain or improve air quality.

Mist collectors remove particulate matter in the form of fine liquid droplets from the air. They are often used for the collection of metal working fluids, and coolant or oil mists. Mist collectors are often used to improve or maintain the quality of air in the workplace environment.

Fume and smoke collectors are used to remove sub-micrometer-size particulates from the air. They effectively reduce or eliminate particulate matter and gas streams from many industrial processes such as welding, rubber and plastic processing, high speed machining with coolants, tempering, and quenching.

== Process ==
Dust collection systems work on the basic formula of capture, convey and collect.

First, the dust must be captured or extracted. This is accomplished with devices such as capture hoods to catch dust at its source of origin. Many times, the machine producing the dust will have a port to which a duct can be directly attached.

Second, the dust must be conveyed. This is done via a ducting system, properly sized and manifolded to maintain a consistent minimum air velocity required to keep the dust in suspension for conveyance to the collection device. A duct of the wrong size can lead to material settling in the duct system and clogging it.

Finally, the dust is collected. This is done via a variety of means, depending on the application and the dust being handled. It can be as simple as a basic pass-through filter, a cyclonic separator, or an impingement baffle. It can also be as complex as an electrostatic precipitator, a multistage baghouse, or a chemically treated wet scrubber or stripping tower.

Smaller dust collection systems use a single-stage vacuum unit to create suction and perform air filtration, where the waste material is drawn into an impeller and deposited into a container such as a bag, barrel, or canister. Air is recirculated into the shop after passing through a filter to trap smaller particulate.

Larger systems utilize a two-stage system, which separates larger particles from fine dust using a pre-collection device, such as a cyclone or baffled canister, before drawing the air through the impeller. Air from these units can then be exhausted outdoors or filtered and recirculated back into the work space.

Dust collection systems are often part of a larger air quality management program that also includes large airborne particle filtration units mounted to the ceiling of shop spaces and mask systems to be worn by workers. Air filtration units are designed to process large volumes of air to remove fine particles (2 to 10 micrometres) suspended in the air. Masks are available in a variety of forms, from simple cotton face masks to elaborate respirators with tanked air — the need for which is determined by the environment in which the worker is operating.

In industry, round or rectangular ducts are used to prevent buildup of dust in processing equipment.

== Types ==
=== Inertial separators ===
Inertial separators separate dust from gas streams using a combination of forces, such as centrifugal, gravitational, and inertial. These forces move the dust to an area where the forces exerted by the gas stream are minimal. The separated dust is moved by gravity into a hopper, where it is temporarily stored.

The three primary types of inertial separators are:

- Settling chambers
- Baffle chambers
- Centrifugal collectors

Neither settling chambers nor baffle chambers are commonly used in the minerals processing industry. However, their principles of operation are often incorporated into the design of more efficient dust collectors.

==== Settling chamber ====
A settling chamber

A settling chamber (or stiveroom) consists of a large box installed in the ductwork. The increase of cross section area at the chamber reduces the speed of the dust-filled airstream and heavier particles settle out.

Settling chambers are simple in design and can be manufactured from almost any material at low cost, and require no water to operate. However, they are seldom used as primary dust collectors because of their large space requirements and low efficiency. A practical use is as precleaners for more efficient collect.

==== Baffle chamber ====
Diagram of a Baffle Chamber

Baffle chambers use a fixed baffle plate that causes the conveying gas stream to make a sudden change of direction. Large-diameter particles do not follow the gas stream but continue into a dead air space and settle. Baffle chambers are used as precleaners.

==== Centrifugal collectors ====
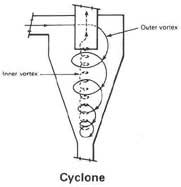

Centrifugal collectors are based on centrifugal systems (centrifuges) and use cyclonic action to separate dust particles from the gas stream. In a typical cyclone, the dust gas stream enters at an angle and is spun rapidly. The centrifugal force created by the circular flow throws the dust particles toward the wall of the cyclone. After striking the wall, these particles fall into a hopper located underneath.

Cyclone separators are found in all types of power and industrial applications, including pulp and paper plants, cement plants, steel mills, petroleum coke plants, metallurgical plants, saw mills and other kinds of facilities that process dust.

Single-cyclone separators create a dual vortex to separate coarse from fine dust. The main vortex spirals downward and carries most of the coarser dust particles. The inner vortex, created near the bottom of the cyclone, spirals upward and carries finer dust particles.

Multiple-cyclone separators consist of a number of small-diameter cyclones, operating in parallel and having a common gas inlet and outlet, as shown in the figure, and operate on the same principle as single cyclone separators—creating an outer downward vortex and an ascending inner vortex. Multiple-cyclone separators remove more dust than single cyclone separators because the individual cyclones have a greater length and smaller diameter.

Secondary-air-flow separators use a secondary air flow, injected into the cyclone to accomplish several things. The secondary air flow increases the speed of the cyclonic action making the separator more efficient; it intercepts the particulate before it reaches the interior walls of the unit; and it forces the separated particulate toward the collection area. The secondary air flow protects the separator from particulate abrasion and allows the separator to be installed horizontally because gravity is not depended upon to move the separated particulate downward.

=== Fabric filters ===
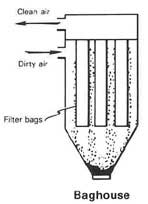

Commonly known as baghouses, fabric collectors use filtration to separate dust particulates from dusty gases. They are one of the most efficient and cost-effective types of dust collectors available, and can achieve a collection efficiency of more than 99% for very fine particulates.

Dust-laden gases enter the baghouse and pass through fabric bags that act as filters. The bags can be of woven or felted cotton, synthetic, or glass-fiber material in either a tube or envelope shape.

=== Wet scrubbers ===
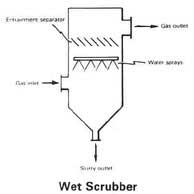

Dust collectors that use liquid are known as wet scrubbers. In these systems, the scrubbing liquid (usually water) comes into contact with a gas stream containing dust particles. Greater contact of the gas and liquid streams yields higher dust removal efficiency.

There is a large variety of wet scrubbers; however, all have one of three basic configurations of gas-humidification, gas-liquid contact or gas-liquid separation - Regardless of the contact mechanism used, as much liquid and dust as possible must be removed. Once contact is made, dust particulates and water droplets combine to form agglomerates. As the agglomerates grow larger, they settle into a collector.

Spray-tower scrubber wet scrubbers may be categorized by pressure drop as follows:

- Low-energy scrubbers (0.5 to 2.5 inches water gauge - 124.4 to 621.9 Pa)
- Low- to medium-energy scrubbers (2.5 to 6 inches water gauge - 0.622 to 1.493 kPa)
- Medium- to high-energy scrubbers (6 to 15 inches water gauge - 1.493 to 3.731 kPa)
- High-energy scrubbers (greater than 15 inches water gauge - greater than 3.731 kPa)

Due to the large number of commercial scrubbers available, it is not possible to describe each individual type here. However, the following sections provide examples of typical scrubbers in each category.

=== Electrostatic precipitators (ESP) ===
Electrostatic precipitators use electrostatic forces to separate dust particles from exhaust gases. A number of high-voltage, direct-current discharge electrodes are placed between grounded collecting electrodes. The contaminated gases flow through the passage formed by the discharge and collecting electrodes. Electrostatic precipitators operate on the same principle as home "Ionic" air purifiers.

The airborne particles receive a negative charge as they pass through the ionized field between the electrodes. These charged particles are then attracted to a grounded or positively charged electrode and adhere to it.

=== Unit collectors ===
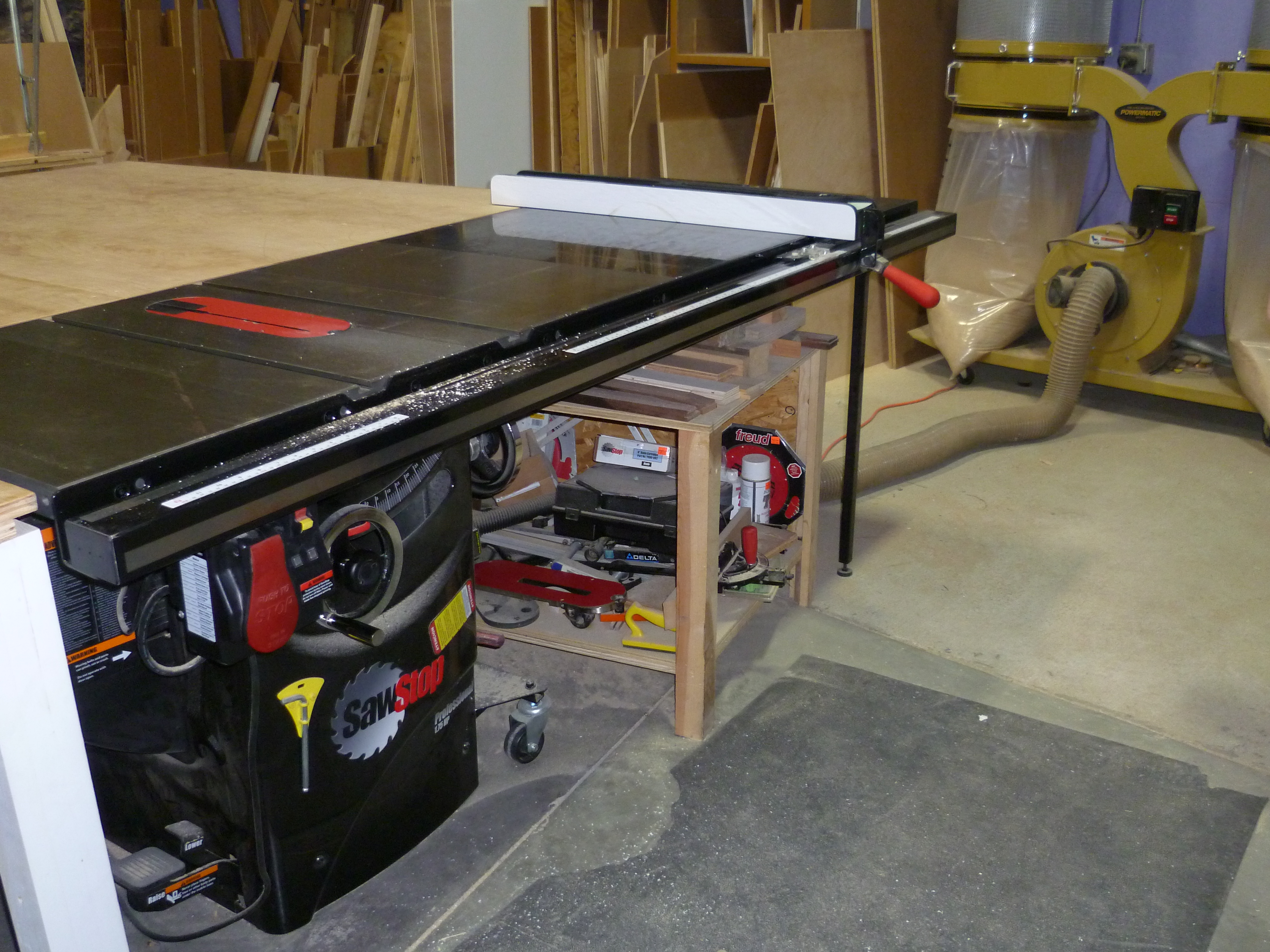
Woodshop table saw (left) with exhaust duct connected to a dust collector (upper right), within a storage warehouse in a former limestone quarry cavern in Ohio

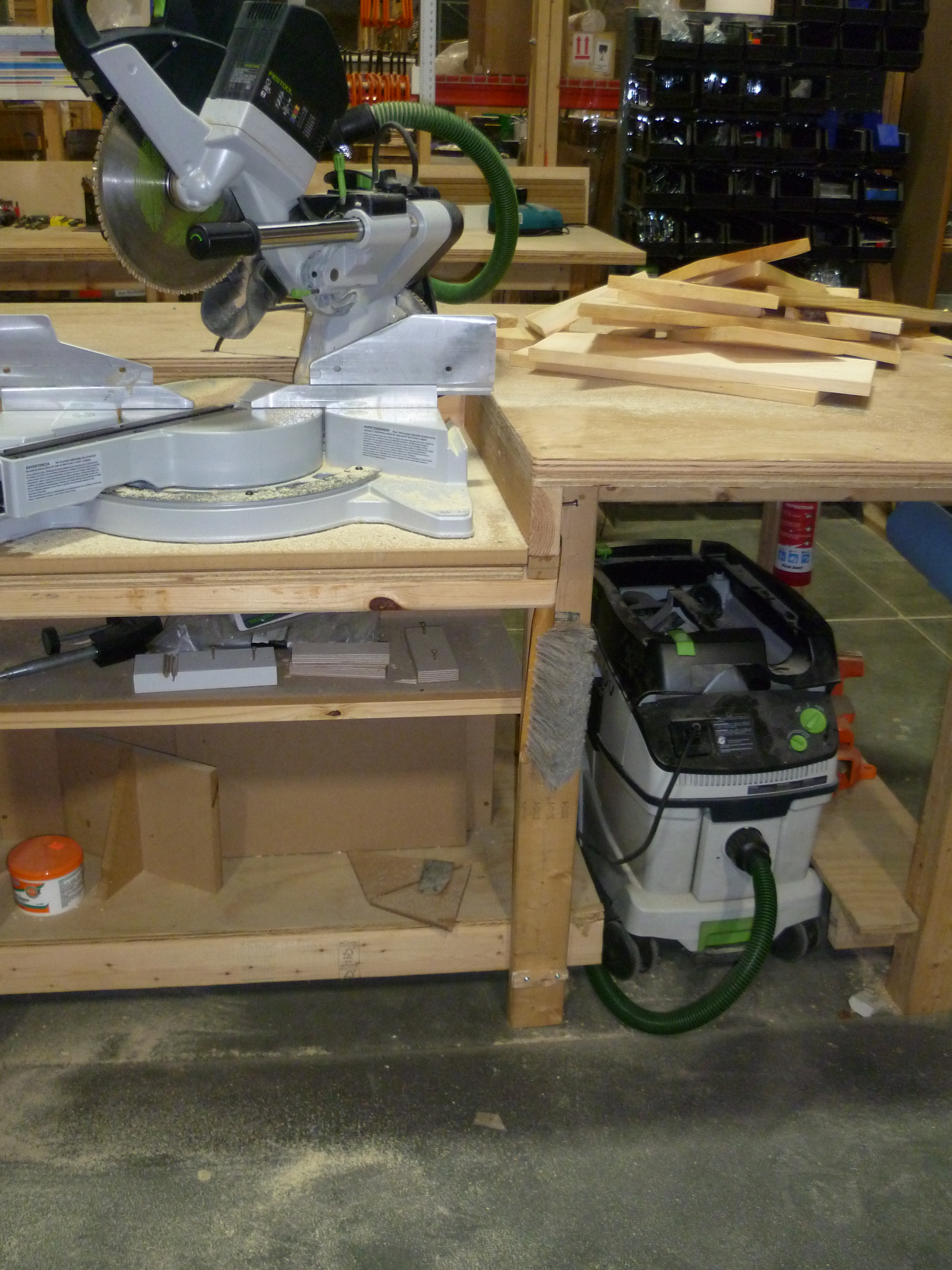
Compound miter saw (upper left) connected to a mobile dust extractor (lower right) in the same workplace

Unlike central collectors, unit collectors control contamination at its source. They are small and self-contained, consisting of a fan and some form of dust collector. They are suitable for isolated, portable, or frequently moved dust-producing operations, such as bins and silos or remote belt-conveyor transfer points. Advantages of unit collectors include small space requirements, the return of collected dust to main material flow, and low initial cost. However, their dust-holding and storage capacities, servicing facilities, and maintenance periods have been sacrificed.

A number of designs are available, with capacities ranging from 200 to 2,000 ft^{3}/min (90 to 900 L/s). There are two main types of unit collectors:

- Fabric collectors, with manual shaking or pulse-jet cleaning - normally used for fine dust
- Cyclone collectors - normally used for coarse dust

Fabric collectors are frequently used in minerals processing operations because they provide high collection efficiency and uninterrupted exhaust airflow between cleaning cycles. Cyclone collectors are used when coarser dust is generated, as in woodworking, metal grinding, or machining.

The following points should be considered when selecting a unit collector:

- Cleaning efficiency must comply with all applicable regulations.
- The unit maintains its rated capacity while accumulating large amounts of dust between cleanings.
- Simple cleaning operations do not increase the surrounding dust concentration.
- Has the ability to operate unattended for extended periods of time (for example, 8 hours).
- Automatic discharge or sufficient dust storage space to hold at least one week's accumulation.
- If renewable filters are used, they should not have to be replaced more than once a month.
- Durable
- Quiet

Use of unit collectors may not be appropriate if the dust-producing operations are located in an area where central exhaust systems would be practical. Dust removal and servicing requirements are expensive for many unit collectors and are more likely to be neglected than those for a single, large collector.

== Design factors ==
Factors affecting the selection and design of a dust collector system include:

- Dust concentration and particle size
- Degree of dust collection required
- Characteristics of air stream (temperature, pressure, flow rate)
- Characteristics of dust - conductivity, toxicity, salvage value
- Methods of disposal
- Size and service life
- Safety

== Fan and motor ==
The fan and motor system supplies mechanical energy to move contaminated air from the dust-producing source to a dust collector.

=== Types of fans ===
There are two main kinds of industrial fans:

- Centrifugal fans
- Axial-flow fans

==== Centrifugal fans ====
Centrifugal fans consist of a wheel or a rotor mounted on a shaft that rotates in a scroll-shaped housing. Air enters at the eye of the rotor, makes a right-angle turn, and is forced through the blades of the rotor by centrifugal force into the scroll-shaped housing. The centrifugal force imparts static pressure to the air. The diverging shape of the scroll also converts a portion of the velocity pressure into static pressure.

There are three main types of centrifugal fans:

- Radial-blade fans - Radial-blade fans are used for heavy dust loads. Their straight, radial blades do not get clogged with material, and they withstand considerable abrasion. These fans have medium tip speeds and medium noise factors.
- Backward-blade fans - Backward-blade fans operate at higher tip speeds and thus are more efficient. Since material may build up on the blades, these fans should be used after a dust collector. Although they are noisier than radial-blade fans, backward-blade fans are commonly used for large-volume dust collection systems because of their higher efficiency.
- Forward-curved-blade fans - These fans have curved blades that are tipped in the direction of rotation. They have low space requirements, low tip speeds, and a low noise factor. They are usually used against low to moderate static pressures.

==== Axial-flow fans ====
Axial-flow fans are used in systems that have low resistance levels. These fans move the air parallel to the fan's axis of rotation. The screw-like action of the propellers moves the air in a straight-through parallel path, causing a helical flow pattern.

The three main kinds of axial fans are:

- Propeller fans - These fans are used to move large quantities of air against very low static pressures. They are usually used for general ventilation or dilution ventilation and are good in developing up to 0.5 in. wg (124.4 Pa).
- Tube-axial fans - Tube-axial fans are similar to propeller fans except they are mounted in a tube or cylinder. Therefore, they are more efficient than propeller fans and can develop up to 3 to 4 in. wg (743.3 to 995 Pa). They are best suited for moving air containing substances such as condensible fumes or pigments.
- Vane-axial fans - Vane-axial fans are similar to tube-axial fans except air-straightening vanes are installed on the suction or discharge side of the rotor. They are easily adapted to multistaging and can develop static pressures as high as 14 to 16 in. wg (3.483 to 3.98 kPa). They are normally used for clean air only.

=== Electric motors ===
Electric motors are used to supply the necessary energy to drive the fan.

Motors are selected to provide sufficient power to operate fans over the full range of process conditions (temperature and flow rate).

Figure 1. Dust collection system example

=== Configurations ===
Dust collectors can be configured into one of five common types:

1. Ambient units - Ambient units are free-hanging systems for use when applications limit the use of source-capture arms or ductwork.
2. Collection booths - Collector booths require no ductwork, and allow the worker greater freedom of movement. They are often portable.
3. Downdraft tables - A downdraft table is a self-contained portable filtration system that removes harmful particulates and returns filtered air back into the facility with no external ventilation required.
4. Source collector or Portable units - Portable units are for collecting dust, mist, fumes, or smoke at the source.
5. Stationary units - An example of a stationary collector is a baghouse.

=== Parameters involved in specifying dust collectors ===
Important parameters in specifying dust collectors include airflow the velocity of the air stream created by the vacuum producer; system power, the power of the system motor, usually specified in horsepower; storage capacity for dust and particles, and minimum particle size filtered by the unit. Other considerations when choosing a dust collection system include the temperature, moisture content, and the possibility of combustion of the dust being collected.

Systems for fine removal may only contain a single filtration system (such as a filter bag or cartridge). However, most units utilize a primary and secondary separation/filtration system. In many cases the heat or moisture content of dust can negatively affect the filter media of a baghouse or cartridge dust collector. A cyclone separator or dryer may be placed before these units to reduce heat or moisture content before reaching the filters. Furthermore, some units may have third and fourth stage filtration. All separation and filtration systems used within the unit should be specified.

A baghouse is an air pollution abatement device used to trap particulate by filtering gas streams through large fabric bags. They are typically made of glass fibers or fabric.

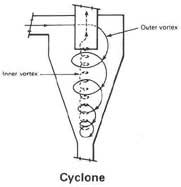

A cyclone separator is an apparatus for the separation, by centrifugal means, of fine particles suspended in air or gas.

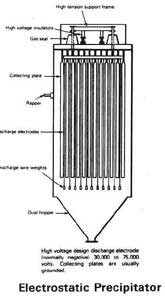

Electrostatic precipitators are a type of air cleaner, which charges particles of dust by passing dust-laden air through a strong (50-100 kV) electrostatic field. This causes the particles to be attracted to oppositely charged plates so that they can be removed from the air stream.

An impinger system is a device in which particles are removed by impacting the aerosol particles into a liquid. Modular media type units combine a variety of specific filter modules in one unit. These systems can provide solutions to many air contaminant problems. A typical system incorporates a series of disposable or cleanable pre-filters, a disposable vee-bag or cartridge filter. HEPA or carbon final filter modules can also be added. Various models are available, including free-hanging or ducted installations, vertical or horizontal mounting, and fixed or portable configurations. Filter cartridges are made out of a variety of synthetic fibers and are capable of collecting sub-micrometre particles without creating an excessive pressure drop in the system. Filter cartridges require periodic cleaning.

A wet scrubber, or venturi scrubber, is similar to a cyclone but it has an orifice unit that sprays water into the vortex in the cyclone section, collecting all of the dust in a slurry system. The water media can be recirculated and reused to continue to filter the air. Eventually the solids must be removed from the water stream and disposed of.

==== Filter cleaning methods ====
Online cleaning – automatically timed filter cleaning which allows for continuous, uninterrupted dust collector operation for heavy dust operations.

Offline cleaning – filter cleaning accomplished during dust collector shut down. Practical whenever the dust loading in each dust collector cycle does not exceed the filter capacity. Allows for maximum effectiveness in dislodging and disposing of dust.

On-demand cleaning – filter cleaning initiated automatically when the filter is fully loaded, as determined by a specified drop in pressure across the media surface.

Reverse-pulse/Reverse-jet cleaning – Filter cleaning method which delivers blasts of compressed air from the clean side of the filter to dislodge the accumulated dust cake.

Impact/Rapper cleaning – Filter cleaning method in which high-velocity compressed air forced through a flexible tube results in an arbitrary rapping of the filter to dislodge the dust cake. Especially effective when the dust is extremely fine or sticky.

== Dangers of neglect ==
Proper dust collection and air filtration is important in any work space. Repeated exposure to wood dust can cause chronic bronchitis, emphysema, "flu-like" symptoms, and cancer. Wood dust also frequently contains chemicals and fungi, which can become airborne and lodge deeply in the lungs, causing illness and damage.

Another concern is the possibility of dust explosions.

== See also ==
- Axial fan design
