= American Radio Relay League, Inc. v. FCC (1980) =

American Radio Relay League, Inc. v. FCC, 617 F.2d 875 (D.C. Cir. 1980) was a notable Court of Appeals for the DC Circuit case between plaintiff, the American Radio Relay League and the Federal Communications Commission regarding licensing rights and radiofrequency interference (RFI). The case was argued in the Court of Appeals on December 12, 1979, and decided on Feb. 22, 1980.

== Background ==
In an effort to combat Citizens band radio interference with television and radio signals, the FCC enacted regulations on the production and sale of linear amplifiers. The FCC justified these regulations in accordance with its mission to "prevent interference between stations".

The number of CB operators had grown drastically since the 1970s. In 1977, when licenses were still required for CB radio, 14 million licensed operators and as many as 6 million illegal operators were using CB radio. CB-related interference to television viewers was on the rise.

The American Radio Relay League (ARRL), a non-profit organization dedicated to amateur ("ham") radio, was concerned with the effect of these rules on the amateur radio service. The ARRL did not protest regulation as a whole, but argued that the regulations had unintended consequences with regard to amateur radio.

== Case ==
The point in question for the court was whether or not the FCC had enacted its regulations with reasonable deliberation. The ARRL was not requesting a complete reversal of the regulation, but it was simply desiring that the FCC be required to renegotiate its regulations and exercise more diligence and deliberation at arriving at its required regulative stances.

The court sympathized with this point, believing that in all likelihood, that the FCC's decision was overly harsh on amateur radio operators. However the court believed it had insufficient reason to prove the FCC had unreasonably mandated its regulations for all radio operators.

The lower court decided that the FCC was responsible for properly handling and regulating all radio and frequency industries and operations. Therefore, its mission encompassed the larger breadth of all communications regulations. With this regard, the court believed it could not aptly define what a reasonable regulation of CB radios would be better than what the FCC, responsible for such regulations, enforced.

== Decision ==
The lower court ruled in favor of the FCC. The Court of Appeals upheld the decision.
