= Linearizer =

Electronic circuit which counteracts non-linear behavior of an amplifier

In signal processing, linearizers are electronic circuits which improve the non-linear behaviour of amplifiers to increase efficiency and maximum output power.

Creating circuits with the inverted behaviour to the amplifier is one way to implement this concept. These circuits counteract the non-linearities of the amplifier and minimize the distortion of the signal. This increases linear operating range up to the saturation (maximum output power) of the amplifier. Linearized amplifiers have a significantly higher efficiency with improved signal quality. There are different concepts to linearize an amplifier, including pre- and post-distortion and feedback linearization. Most commonly used is pre-distortion linearization.

The function performed by the linearizer in relation to the amplifier is very similar to that of eyeglasses in relation to the eye. The eye distorts the image seen; the glasses pre-distort the image. When these two distortions are combined, the result is a clear image. For the nearsighted, the glasses must pre-distort the image one way. For the farsighted, the image must be pre-distorted in the opposite way.

== Functionality of Pre-distortion Linearizers ==
Non-linearities occur in amplifiers due to decreasing amplification and changing phase when operated near saturation. This behavior is commonly referred to as gain or phase compression. The pre-distortion linearizer is designed to compensate these changes. The resulting behavior is commonly referred to as gain or phase expansion.

A pre-distortion linearizer works by creating signal distortion (amplitude and phase) that is the complement of the signal distortion inherent in the High-Powered Amplifier. The signal to be amplified is first passed through the linearizer, distorting the signal, with no loss in gain. The distorted signal is then fed to the High-Powered Amplifier to be amplified. The distortion inherent in the High-Powered Amplifier negates the distortion introduced by the linearizer producing a near linear transfer characteristic.

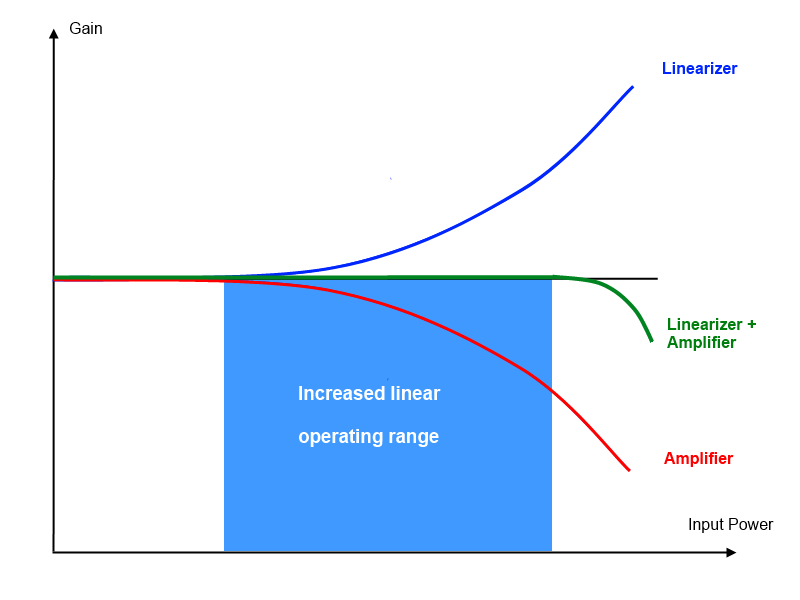
Fig. 1: Gain plotted against input power

Figure 1 shows the amplification (gain) contingent upon input power. The gain compression of the amplifier starts above a certain input power level (red curve). By adding a pre-distortion linearizer (blue curve) in front of the amplifier, the gain compression effect is compensated up to a certain power level (green curve). The point where the gain of the total system is starting to drop off is pushed to a higher power level thereby increasing the linear operating range. In practice, the linear output power level of an amplifier increases significantly (up to four times).

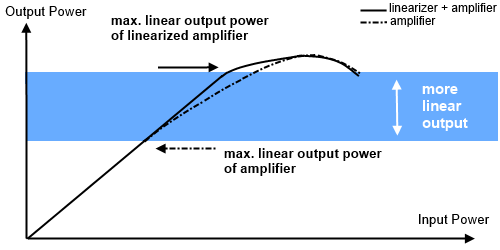
Fig. 2: Output Power contingent upon input power

The increased linear operating range is also illustrated in Figure 2 (light blue area). The chart shows the relationship between input and output power of an amplifier with and without pre-distortion linearizer. The dotted line shows the output power of the amplifier as a function of the input power on a logarithmic scale. In this illustration the compression is shown as the deviation from the ideal 45° line. The amplifier with pre-distortion linearizer (solid line) deviates from the ideal line at a much higher power level. The light blue area illustrates the improved linear operating power range gained by adding a pre-distortion linearizer.

== Advantages of Pre-distortion Linearizers ==
Pre-distortion linearizers operate in the small signal area and increase the DC power consumption of the system only marginally. Additional advantages can be deduced including:

- Small foot print, low weight.
- Low cost solution compared to use of higher power amplifier in similar linear operating range.
- Lower environmental impact through improved efficiency.
- Retrofit possible
- Adjustment to different amplifier types possible
- Highly reliable

== Typical Properties of a Pre-distortion Linearizer ==
- Dimensions: Dependent on design in the range of a few cm
- Weight: 20g to 200g depending on features
- Frequencies: 1 to 50 GHz with different bandwidths
- Expansion levels:
  - Gain: up to 10 dB, dependent on amplifier data
  - Phase: up to 60°

== Applications ==
The preferred application of linearizers is in high power amplifiers using electron tubes (traveling wave tubes, Klystron tubes, magnetron tubes) or solid state amplifiers (GaN, GaAs, Si). These systems are used in broadband voice and data transfer applications including Satellite Communication, Broadband Internet, or HD/3D television. These applications require high signal quality. The optimization of the amplifier characteristics enables the ideal use of available power and leads to energy savings of up to 50%.
