= Process duct work =

Industrial ventilation system

Process duct work conveys large volumes of hot, dusty air from processing equipment to mills, baghouses to other process equipment. Process duct work may be round or rectangular. Although round duct work costs more to fabricate than rectangular duct work, it requires fewer stiffeners and is favored in many applications over rectangular ductwork.

The air in process duct work may be at ambient conditions or may operate at up to 900 °F (482 °C). Process ductwork varies in size from 2 ft diameter to 20 ft diameter or to perhaps 20 ft by 40 ft rectangular.

Large process ductwork may fill with dust, depending on slope, to up to 30% of cross section, which can weigh 2 to 4 tons per linear foot.

Round ductwork is subject to duct suction collapse, and requires stiffeners to minimize this, but is more efficient in material than rectangular duct work.

There are no comprehensive, design references for process duct work design. The ASCE reference for the design of power plant duct design gives some general guidance on duct design, but does not specifically give designers sufficient information to design process duct work.

== Structural process ductwork ==
Structural process ductwork carries large volumes of high temperature, dusty air, between pieces of process equipment. The design of this ductwork requires an understanding of the interaction of heat softening of metals, potential effects of dust buildup in large ductwork, and structural design principles. There are two basic shapes for structural process ductwork: rectangular and round. Rectangular ductwork is covered by the ASCE "The Structural Design of Air & Gas Ducts for Process Power Stations and Industrial Applications".

In the practical design of primarily round structural process ductwork in the cement, lime and lead industries, the duct size involved ranges from 18 inches (46 cm) to 30 feet (9.1 m). The air temperature may vary from ambient to 1,000 °F (538 °C). Process ductwork is subject to large loads due to dust buildup, fan suction pressure, wind, and earthquake forces. As of 2009 30 ft diameter process ductwork may cost $7,000 per ton. Failure to properly integrate design forces may lead to catastrophic duct collapse. Overdesign of ductwork is expensive.

=== Round and rectangular duct structural design ===
The structural design of ductwork plate is based on buckling of the plate element. Round ductwork plate design is based on diameter to duct plate thickness ratios, and the allowable stresses are contained in multiple references such as US Steel Plate, ASME/ANSI STS-1, SMNACA, Tubular Steel Structures, and other references. In actuality round ductwork bent in bending is approximately 30% stronger than a similar shape in compression, however one uses the same allowable stresses in bending as we do for compression.

Round ducts require typical stiffeners at roughly 3 diameter spacing, or roughly 20 ft. O.C. for wind ovaling and fabrication and truck shipping requirements. Round ducts, larger than 6 feet 6 inches (1.98 m) in diameter (1/4" plate) require support ring stiffeners. Smaller-diameter ducts may not require support ring stiffeners, but may be designed with saddle supports. When stiffener rings are required they are traditionally designed based on "Roark", although this reference is quite conservative.

Round duct elbow allowable stresses are lower than the allowable stresses for straight duct by a K factor = 1.65/(h 2/3power) where h = t (duct) * R (elbow) /(r(duct)*r (duct). This equation, or similar equations is found in Tubular Steel Structures section 9.9.

Rectangular ductwork design properties is based on width-to-thickness ratios. This is simplified, normally to width=t/16, from corner elements or corner angle stiffeners, although in reality, the entire duct top & side plate does participate, somewhat in duct section properties.

=== Duct logic ===
Duct logic is the process of planning for duct thermal movement, combined with planning to minimize duct dust dropout.

Ducts move with changes in internal temperature. Ducts are assumed to have the same temperature as their internal gasses, which may be up to 900 °F. If the internal duct temperature exceeds 1000 °F, refractory lining is used to minimize the duct surface temperature. At 1000 °F, ducts may grow approximately 5/8 inch per 10 feet of length. This movement must be carefully planned for, with cloth (or metal) expansion joints at each equipment flange, and one joint per each straight section of ductwork.

Sloping ductwork at or above the duct dust angle of repose will minimize dust buildup. Therefore, many ducts carrying high dust loads slope at 30 degrees, or steeper.

=== Duct elbow geometry ===
To minimize pressure loss in duct elbows, the typical elbow radius is 1 1/2 times the duct diameter. In cases where this elbow radius is not feasible, turning vanes are added to the duct.

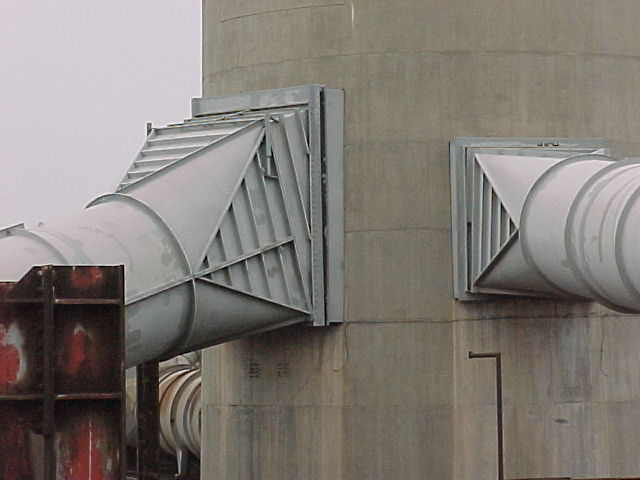
Stack transition at concrete stack

=== Duct transition and elbow layout ===
Process ductwork is often large (6-foot diameter to 18-foot diameter), carrying large volumes of hot dirty gasses, at velocities of 3000 to 4500 feet per minute. The fans used to move these gasses are also large, 250 to 4000 horsepower. Therefore, minimizing duct pressure drop by minimizing turbulence at elbows and transitions is of importance. Duct elbow radius is usually 1 1/2 to 2 times the duct size. The side slopes of transitions are typically 10 to 30 degrees.

Note: the duct gas velocity is chosen to minimize duct dust dropout. Cement and lime plant duct velocity at normal operations is 3000 to 3200-foot per minute, lead plant velocities are 4000 to 4500-foot per minute, as the dust is heavier. Other industries, such as grain have lower gas velocities. Higher duct gas velocity may require more powerful fans than lower duct velocities.

=== Duct support types ===
- Fixed supports typically are designed to resist lateral movement of the duct. Depending on the support geometry, fixed supports may also resist rotation of the duct art the support.
- Sliding supports are typically supported on Teflon, (or other material) pads, isolated from the duct so that temperature and dust does not damage the sliding surface.
- Link supports are often "bents", or braced frames down from the duct support ring (frame) to a foundation or support plane. if the bent is long enough, hinges are not required to allow for duct thermal growth.
- Rod or hanger supports are similar to link supports, but due to the flexibility of the rod supports, that are easier to design and detail.
- Guide supports: Often rings inside a structural frame, with angle guides, that allow the duct to grow vertically while restraining the duct laterally for wind loads.
- Unusual "support" conditions (details):
  - Hinges at expansion joints
  - Tension ties across dual fixed supports
  - Designs that allowing duct elbows to flex under unusual support conditions
  - Other unusual design models.

=== Duct design loads ===
For cement plant and Lime plant process ductwork, duct loads are a combination of:

1. Duct dead loads: are often simplified (in Cement plant usage) by using duct plate weight, multiplied by 1.15 as a stiffener allowance, as duct stiffeners usually weigh less than 15% times the duct plate weight. Duct stiffener allowance for rectangular power plants ductwork may be 50% to 100% of the duct plate weight.
2. Duct internal dust loads (bottom of duct): which vary considerably with duct slope. These loads need to be approved by the client, but are often used as follows:

For duct sloping 0 degrees to 30 degrees, duct internal dust is 25% of duct cross section. For duct sloping 30 degrees to 45 degrees duct dust loads are reduced to 15% of cross section, plus internal duct coating loads. For ducts sloping 45 degrees to 85 degrees, duct internal dust is 5% of duct cross section, plus internal duct coating loads. For ducts sloping over 85 degrees. Because of the potential for high dust loading, most process ductwork is run at a 30 to 45 degree slope.

2a) Duct dust loading in non-process ducts (2-foot diameter and smaller), such as conveyor venting ducts are sometimes run horizontally and can be filled to 100% of cross section.

2b) Power plant internal duct dust loads are coordinated with the client, and are sometimes used at 1 to 2-foot of internal ash loadings.

3) Duct internal, coating dust loads, which sometimes are used as a 2 in (51 mm) coating of dust on the internal perimeter.

4) Duct suction pressure loads. Most process duct loads have design pressures of 25 to 40 inches (640 to 1,020 mm) of water pressure. This suction pressure operates to cause suction pressure collapse on the duct side walls. Also this pressure operates perpendicular to the duct "expansion joints" to create an additional load on the duct supports that adds to dead, and live loads. Please note: duct pressure loads vary with temperature, as the gas density varies with temperature. A duct pressure of 25 inches of H_{2}O, at room temperature may become 12 inches to 6 inches at duct operating pressures.

5) Duct wind loads

6) Duct Seismic loads

7) Duct Snow loads, normally inconsequential, as snow will melt quickly unless the plant is in shutdown mode.

8) Top of duct dust loads, often used as zero, since plant dust generation is much less now, than in the past.

9) Duct suction pressure loads, act perpendicular to end of duct cross section, and can be significant. For a duct designed for 25" of water at a startup temperature of 70 degree F, on an 8-foot in diameter duct, this is equal to 8000 pounds at each end of the duct.

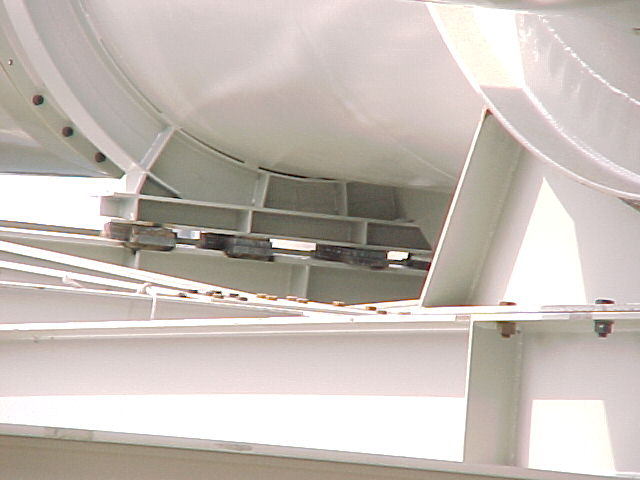
Duct fixed support

== Round ductwork ==
The majority of cement plant process ductwork is round. This is because the round duct shape does not bend between circumferential stiffeners. Therefore, bending stiffeners are not required, and round ductwork requires fewer and lighter intermediate stiffeners than rectangular ductwork. Round cement plant duct stiffeners are sometimes about 5% duct plate weight. Rectangular cement plant duct stiffeners are 15 to 20% times duct plate weight. Power plant ductwork is often larger. Power plant ductwork is usually rectangular, with stiffener weights of 50% (or more) times duct plate weight. (this is based on personal experience, and my vary with loads, duct size, and industry standards)

Large, round process ductwork is usually fabricated from 1/4-inch (6.4 mm) mild steel plate, with ovaling stiffening rings at 15 to 20 ft (4.6 to 6.1 m) on center, regardless of diameter. These lengths allow for resistance to wind ovaling and resistance to out of round when shipping by truck. This also works well with fabricator equipment.

The typical intermediate rings are designed for wind bending stresses, reduced as required by the yield stress reduction at working temperatures. The typical rings are fabricated from rolled steel plate, angles or tee's welded together to create the ring cross section required. Rings are fabricated from any combination of plate, tee or W shape that the shop can roll. Rings are usually mild carbon steel, ASTM A36 plate, or equivalent. The location of ring butt welds should preferably be offset 15 degrees(+/-)from point of maximum stress to minimize the effect of weld porosity on weld allowable stress.

See US Steel Plate, volume II for empirical ring spacing, and wind bending stress: Spacing = Ls = 60 sqrt [Do (ft) * t plate (in) /wind pressure (psf)] Section = p * L (spacing, ft) * Do (ft) * Do (ft)/Fb (20,000 at ambient T) This reference is older, but a good starting point for duct design.

SMACNA, (2ND Edition) chapter 4 has many useful formulas for round ducts, allowable stresses, ring spacing, effect of dust, ice, and live loads. The basic factor of safety for SMACNA, 3, is larger than typically used on typical structural engineering projects, of 1.6. Under SMACNA the critical ring spacing for rings is L = 1.25 * D (ft) sqrt (D(ft)/t(inches)), which is similar to tubular steel structures, L = 3.13 * R sqrt (R/t). In effect, using Spacing = 60 sqrt [Do (ft) * t plate (in) /wind pressure (psf)] is conservative.

Allowable bending and compression stress in ducts can come from several sources.

See API 560 for design of wind ovaling stiffeners

See Tubular Steel structures, chapter 2, 9 & 12 for the allowable stresses for thin, round ducts, their allowable stresses, elbows, elbow softening coefficients, and some procedures for the design of duct support rings. These allowable stresses can be verified with select review of chapters of US Steel Plate, Blodgett Design of plate structures, Roark & Young, or API 650.

Round duct support rings are spaced, often at three diameters, or as require at up to about 50 ft centers (14 m). At this spacing the main support rings are designed for the sum of suction pressure stresses & support bending moments.

Round ductwork allowable compressive stress is = 662 /(d/t) +339 * Fy (tubular steel structures, chapter 2). Other reference use similar equations.

Ductwork typical cement plant pressure drops are: 60% to 80% of high temperature process duct work pressure drop occurs in the process equipment, baghouses, mills and cyclones. Since motor 1 (one) horsepower cost roughly $1000/year (US$) (2005), duct efficiency is important. Minimizing duct pressure drop can reduce plan operating costs. most ductwork, non-equipment pressure drop occurs at transitions and changes of directions (elbows). The bests way to minimize duct pressure drop or to minimize plant operating costs, is to use elbows with an elbow radius to duct radius exceeding 1.5. (For a 15-foot duct, the elbow radius would therefore equal, or exceed, 22.5 ft.)

Process duct pressure drops (US practice) are usually measured in inches of water. A typical duct operates at about - 25 inches (160 psf.) total suction pressure, with roughly 75% of the pressure loss in the bag house, and 10% of pressure lost in duct friction, and 15% (nominal)lost in elbow turbulence. A major consideration of duct design is to minimize duct pressure losses, turbulence, as poor duct geometry, increases turbulence, and increases plant electrical usage.

Round duct work suction pressure collapse, in ducts over 6 feet in diameter, is prevented with rings at supports, and roughly 3 diameter centers.

Round duct support rings are traditionally designed from the formula's found in Roark & Young. However, this reference is based on point loads on rings, while actual duct ring loads are based on almost uniform bottom dust. Therefore, these formulars can be shown with Ram, or other analysis methods to have conservatism factor of roughly 2 above the stresses given In Roark. The duct ring force dead, live and dust forces need to be combined with suction pressure stresses. Suction pressure forces concentrate on the rings, as they are the stiffest element present.

Round ductwork elbow allowable stresses are reduced due to the elbow curvature. Various references give similar results for this reduction. Tubular steel structures, Section 9.9 gives the (Beskin) reduction factor of K= 1.65/(h (2/3 power)) where h= t (plate) *R(elbow)/ r (duct) (where suction pressures are smaller). This K reduces the I factor of the duct I effective = I/K.

Round duct rings are fabricated from rolled tees, angles, or plates, welded into the shape required. Typically these are designed with ASTM A-36 properties.

=== Factors of safety ===
Typical duct round plate factor of safety (traditional factor of safety) should be 1.6, because duct plate bending, and buckling is mostly controlled by typical intermediate ring design.

Typical intermediate ring factor of safety should be 1.6, because there is ample evidence in various codes, (API 360, etc.) that intermediate rings designed for wind ovaling and suction pressure combinations are safe.

Typical main support ring factor of safety, if designed by "Roark" formulas should be 1.6, (If constructed to the Roark normal 1% out of round standard tolerance) because it can be shown by various methods that these formulas are at least a factor of two, above three D duct ring analysis results etc..

Typical duct elbow factor of safety should be above 1.6, because it can be difficult to show that shipping out of round for elbows corresponds to the normal 1% out of round standard tolerance. (various code and reference notes).

== Round structural conveyor tubes ==
Round structural tubes are sometimes used to support and contain conveyors transporting coal, lead concentrate, or other dusty material over county roads, plant access roads, or river barge loading facilities. When tubes are used for these purposes they may be 10'-6" to 12-foot diameter, and up to 250-foot long, using up to 1/2" plate and ovaling ring stiffeners at 8-foot (to 20-foot centers). On one such project My firm added L8x8x3/4 at the top 45 degree location to stiffen the plate near the point of maximum stress for tubes (as per Timoshenko, and others).

Some vendor provide conveyor galleries for the same purpose.

== Rectangular ductwork ==
Rectangular cement plant ductwork is often 1/4 in (6.4 mm) duct plate, with stiffeners spaced at about 2'-6", depending on suction pressure and temperature. Thinner plate requires a closer stiffener spacing. The stiffeners are usually considered pinned end. Power plant ductwork can be 5/16" thick duct plate, with "fixed end" W stiffeners at roughly 2'-5" spacing. Because rectangular duct plate bends, stiffeners are required at reasonably close spacing. Duct plate 3/16", or thinner, may dishpan, or make noise, and should be avoided.

Rectangular duct section properties are calculated from the distance between the upper to lower duct corners of the ductwork The flanges areas are based on the size of corner angles plus duct plate width based on the plate thickness ratio of 16*t. (see AISC structural duct design below) For section properties the "web" plate is ignored.

The typical stiffener spacing for cement plant duct work is usually based on duct plate bending M = W * L * L / 8. This is because using a fixed-fixed condition requires difficult to design plate attachments. Power plant, and other larger ductwork, usually goes thru the expense of creating "fixed End" corner moment. all stiffeners for rectangular ductwork requires consideration of lateral torsional bracing stiffeners.

== Effect of temperature on duct yield stress ==
Ducts are usually designed as if the duct plate and stiffener temperatures match the internal duct gas temperatures. For mild carbon steels (ASTM A36) temperatures, the design yield stress ratio at 300 °F is 84% of room temperature stress. At 500 °F, the design yield stress ratio is 77% of room temperature stress. At 700 °F, the design yield stress ratio is about 71% of room temperature stress. Temperatures above 800 °F may cause mild carbon steel to warp. This is because, in this temperature range, the crystal lattice structure of mild carbon steel changes with temperatures above about 800 degrees F (reference, US Steel Plate, elevated temperature steel).

For ductwork operating above 800 degrees F, duct plate material should resist warping. Either Core-ten or ASTM A304 stainless steel may be used for duct plate between 800 °F and 1200 °F, Core-ten plate is less expensive than stainless steel.

Corten steels have essentially the same yield stress ratios as Corten through 700 °F. At 900 °F, the yield stress ratio is 63%. At 1100 °F, the yield stress ratio is 58% (AISC tables). Corten steels should not be used above 1100 °F.

Unless the duct and its stiffeners are insulated, the stiffeners can be designed in ASTM A36 steels, even at a duct temperature of 1000 °F. This is because the stiffener temperature is cooler than the duct gas temperature by several hundred degrees (F). Duct stiffener temperatures are assumed to drop about 100 °F per inch of depth (when uninsulated) (no reference available).

== Corrosion and wear resistance ==
=== Corrosion ===
As reducing the loss of heat at plants has changed over the years, ductwork now connects more pieces of equipment than ever before. Care needs to be taken to avoid condensation of moisture in plant ductwork. Once condensation occurs, the condensation may absorb CO_{2}, other components in the gas stream, and become corrosive on low carbon steel. Methods to avoid this problem may include

1. Duct insulation
2. specialty steels, such as COR-10 steels or A304 SS or A316L SS,
3. Duct internal coatings. Duct internal coatings are expensive, and may cost more than the stack plate they protect. Uncoated stacks cement plant stacks, with condensation, have been noted to last less than two years.

Sulfuric acid attack may require stainless steel ducts, fiberglass ducts, etc.

=== Wear resistance ===
Many plant exhaust gasses contain dusts with high wear potential. Typically wear resistant steels are not useful in resisting duct wear, particularly at higher temperatures. Wear resistant steel ducts are hard to fabricate, and refractory coatings are usually less expensive than wear resistant steel ductwork. Each industry may have different approaches to resist duct wear.

Cement plant clinker dust is more abrasive than sand. In high temperature ducts, or ducts with wear potential, 2 1/2-inch refractory, is often anchored to the duct plate with V anchors at 6" O.C. (+/-) to resist a) temperature, or b) wear at elbows or a combination of these effects. Occasionally ceramic tiles or ceramic mortars are anchored to ductwork to resist temperature and wear.

Grain plant hulls are also very abrasive. Sometimes plastic liners are used to resist wear in grain facilities, where temperatures are lower than in mineral processing facilities.

== Expansion joint types ==
Duct segments are typically separated with metal or fabric expansion joints. These joints are designed and detailed for the duct suction pressure, temperatures, and movements between duct segments. Fabric joints are often chosen to separate the duct segments because they usually cost 40% less than metal joints. Also metal joints place an additional loads onto duct segments. Metal joints prefer axial movements, and provide significant lateral loads onto duct segments. fabric joints cost $100 to $200 per square foot of joint (2010). Metal joints can cost twice this amount.

fabric expansion duct forces are assumed to be 0 #/inch. Metal expansion joint forces for metal joints a 24-inch diameter duct are on the order of 850#/ inch of movement for axial spring rate, and 32,500 #/inch for lateral movement. These coefficients will vary with duct size, joint thickness, and becomes larger for rectangular ducts (based on one recent job).

Fabric expansion joint life is about 5 years under field conditions. Many plants prefer access platforms near the joints for replacing the joint fabric.

== Finite element software ==
Currently software is available to model ductwork in 3D. This software needs to be used with care, as the design rules for width to thickness and elbow softening coefficients, etc., may not be input into the design program.

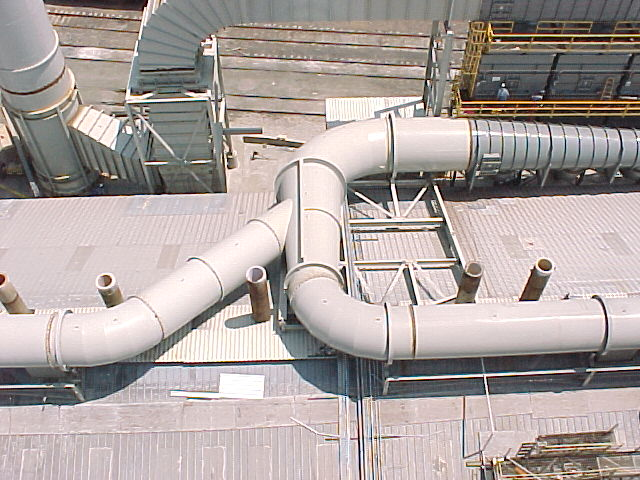
Duct transition and reinforcing

== Drawing presentation and dimensioning ==
It is easy to draw ducts in 3D without correct dimensioning. Drawings should be laid out with:

- Work points, with elevations, and plan dimensioning.
- Elbow radius, duct diameters, or width and thickness dimensions, elbow tangent dimensions (true view and plan and elevation views)
- Column grids, dimensions between supports, showing work points
- Lack of dimensions in 3D generated drawings makes drawings hard to follow.
- supports need to be coordinated with elevations.

== Special duct loading conditions ==
Special duct loading conditions may occur outside of dead, live, dust and temperature conditions. Ductwork associated with coal mills, coke grinding facilities, and to some extent grain processing facilities, may be subject to explosive dusts. Ductwork designed for explosive dust is typically designed for 50 psi internal pressure, and will typically have one explosion relief one vent per duct section. the likelihood of a dust explosion on an indirect coal mill system is 100%, over time. This can generate a plum of fire 5 ft. to 15 ft. in diameter, and 20 ft. to 30 ft. long. Therefore, access to areas surrounding explosion vents shall limit personal access with locked access.

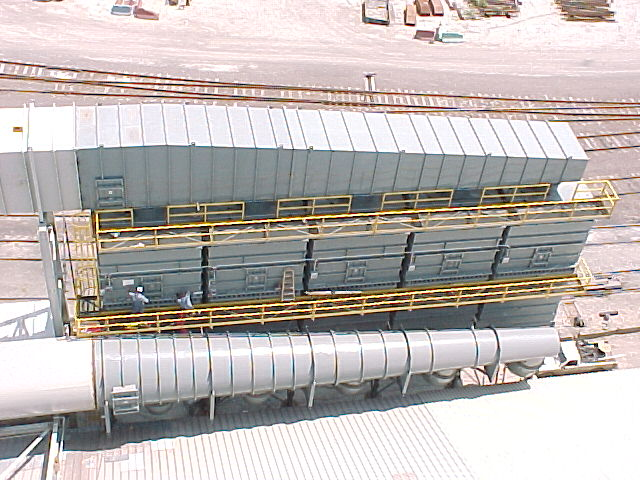
Large baghouse inlet and outlet ductwork

== Duct details ==
Ducts are shipped from fabricating facility to job sites on trucks, by rail, or on barges in lengths accommodating the mode of transport, often in 20-foot sections. These sections are connected with flanges, or weld straps. Flanges are provided at expansion joints, or to join low stress duct sections. Flanges may be difficult to design for the duct plate forces. Flange gaskets add flexibility to the flanges that make their ability to carry forces problematic. Therefore, weld straps (short steel straps) are commonly used for higher stress duct plate connections.

== Various duct photos ==
A close look at the fixed duct support photo shows several properties or round ring supports. There are stiffeners at roughly 60 degrees on center. This duct ring is fabricated from two rolled WTs, welded at the center. This is a smaller duct, with light loads, so that the bottom flange was slightly modified by support clearance requirements. A small gap is shown for placing the duct PTFE slide bearing, although a fixed support could also be inserted in this gap. In the background of this photo is a duct flange. The duct flange normally has 3/4" bolts at 6" nominal; spacing. Duct flange angle thickness needs to be designed for duct plate tensile stresses, as flanges will bend. 5/16" or 3/8" angle thicknesses are common.

See above photo of round duct elbows, transitions, and stiffeners. The duct elbow radius is from 1 1/2 to 2 times the duct diameter. The round duct has ovaling, and shipping rings at 20-foot nominal spacing, and larger support rings at supports. The Y split has suction stiffeners at the duct intersection. Note the 3000 HP fan inlet transition and stack inlet transition also shown in this photo.

The adjacent photo also shows several principles of process ductwork. It shows a large baghouse inlet ductwork. The inlet duct is tapered to minimize dust dropout. A shallow taper such at this also reduces pressure losses when changing duct diameters. Note the rectangular duct ring spacing is roughly 2'-6" on center. The round duct is stiffened near each branch duct.
