= Linear amplifier =

Electronic circuit

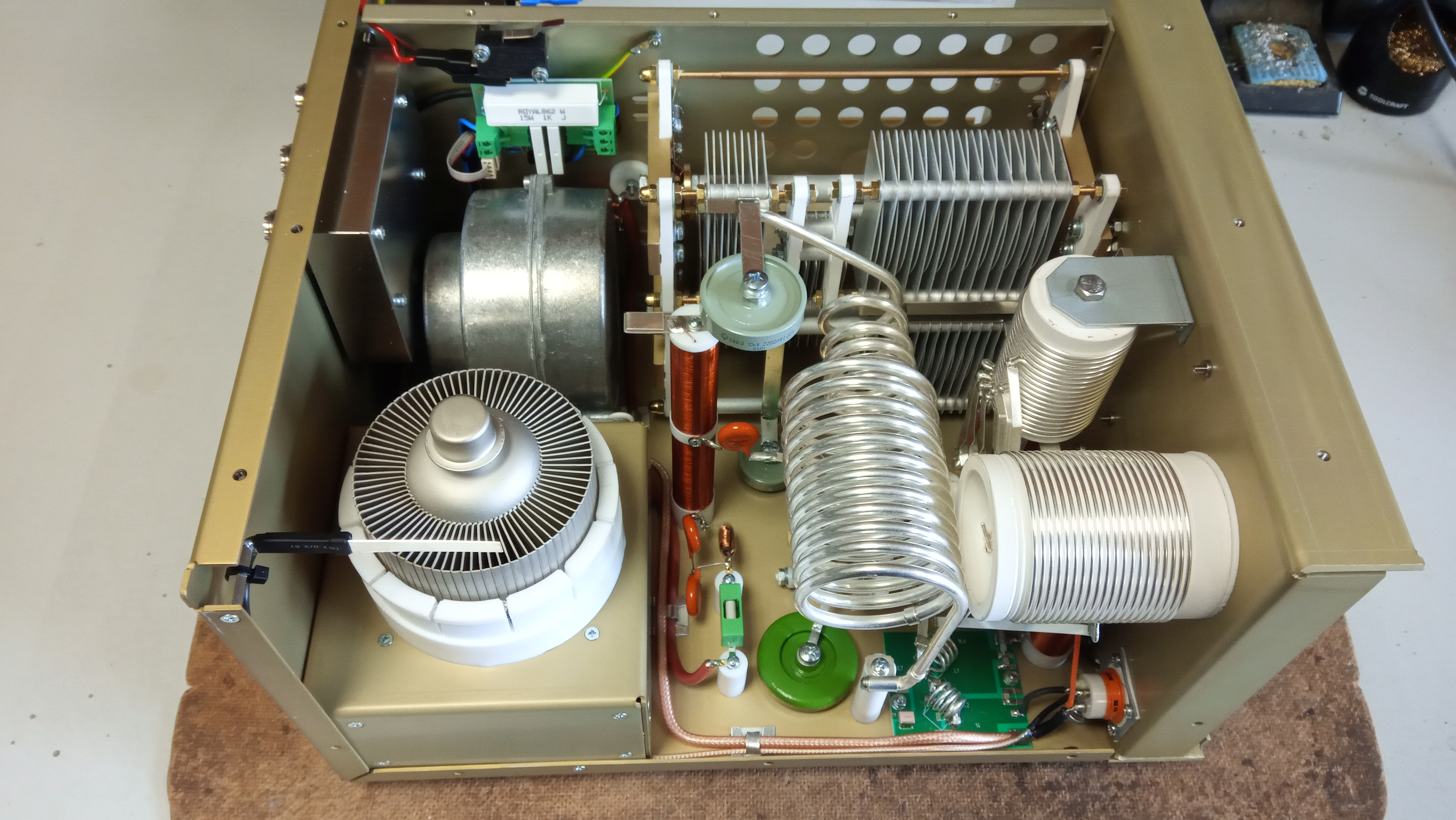
Opened 2 kW HF linear amplifier from OM-Power (Slovakia)

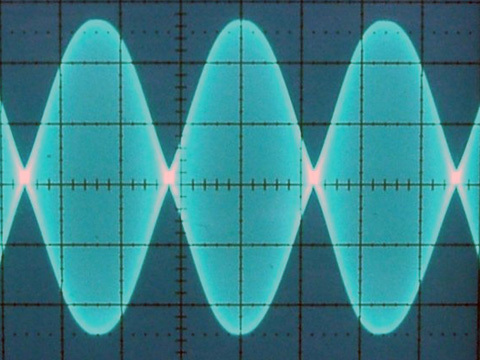
Linearity testing of a single-sideband transmitter

A linear amplifier is an electronic circuit whose output is proportional to its input, but capable of delivering more power into a load. The term usually refers to a type of radio-frequency (RF) power amplifier, some of which have output power measured in kilowatts, and are used in amateur radio. Other types of linear amplifier are used in audio and laboratory equipment. Linearity refers to the ability of the amplifier to produce signals that are accurate copies of the input. A linear amplifier responds to different frequency components independently, and tends not to generate harmonic distortion or intermodulation distortion. No amplifier can provide perfect linearity however, because the amplifying devices—transistors or vacuum tubes—follow nonlinear transfer function and rely on circuitry techniques to reduce those effects. There are a number of amplifier classes providing various trade-offs between implementation cost, efficiency, and signal accuracy.

== Explanation ==
Linearity refers to the ability of the amplifier to produce signals that are accurate copies of the input, generally at increased power levels. Load impedance, supply voltage, input base current, and power output capabilities can affect the efficiency of the amplifier.

Class-A amplifiers can be designed to have good linearity in both single ended and push-pull topologies. Amplifiers of classes AB1, AB2 and B can be linear only when a tuned tank circuit is employed, or in the push-pull topology, in which two active elements (tubes, transistors) are used to amplify positive and negative parts of the RF cycle respectively. Class-C amplifiers are not linear in any topology.

== Amplifier classes ==
There are a number of amplifier classes providing various trade-offs between implementation cost, efficiency, and signal accuracy. Their use in RF applications are listed briefly below:

- Class-A amplifiers are very inefficient, they can never have an efficiency better than 50%. The semiconductor or vacuum tube conducts throughout the entire RF cycle. The mean anode current for a vacuum tube should be set to the middle of the linear section of the curve of the anode current vs grid bias potential.
- Class-B amplifiers can be 60–65% efficient. The semiconductor or vacuum tube conducts through half the cycle but requires large drive power.
- Class AB1 is where the grid is more negatively biased than it is in class A.
- Class AB2 is where the grid is often more negatively biased than in AB1, also the size of the input signal is often larger. When the drive is able to make the grid become positive the grid current will increase.
- Class-C amplifiers can be about 75% efficient with a conduction range of about 120°, but they are very nonlinear. They can only be used for non-AM modes, such as FM, CW, or RTTY. The semiconductor or vacuum tube conducts through less than half the RF cycle. The increase in efficiency can allow a given vacuum tube to deliver more RF power than it could in class A or AB. For instance two 4CX250B tetrodes operating at 144 MHz can deliver 400 watts in class A, but when biased into class C they can deliver 1,000 watts without fear of overheating. Even more grid current will be needed.
- Class-D amplifiers use switching technology to achieve high efficiency, often exceeding 90%, thereby requiring less power to operate, compared with that of other amplifier types. Because of the digital train used to drive the amplifier, many do not consider the Class-D amplifier a linear amplifier, yet many audio and radio manufacturers have incorporated its design into linear applications.

Although class-A power amplifiers (PA) are best in terms of linearity, their efficiency is rather poor as compared with other amplification classes such as “AB”, “C” and Doherty amplifiers. However, higher efficiency leads to higher nonlinearity and PA output will be distorted, often to extent that fails the system performance requirements. Therefore, class-AB power amplifiers or other variations are used with some suitable form of linearization schemes such as feedback, feedforward or analog or digital predistortion (DPD). In DPD power amplifier systems, the transfer characteristics of the amplifier are modeled by sampling the output of the PA and the inverse characteristics are calculated in a DSP processor. The digital baseband signal is multiplied by the inverse of PA nonlinear transfer characteristics, up-converted to RF frequencies and is applied to the PA input. With careful design of PA response, the DPD engines can correct the PA output distortion and achieve higher efficiencies.

With advances in digital signal processing techniques, digital predistortion (DPD) is now widely used for RF power amplifier subsystems. In order for a DPD to function properly the power amplifier characteristics need to be optimal and circuit techniques are available to optimize the PA performance.

== Amateur radio ==
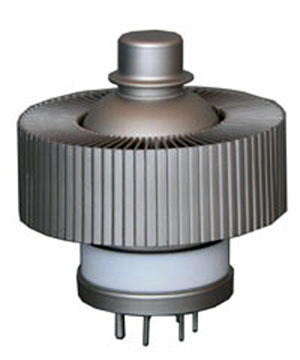
Power triode Eimac 3CX1500A7

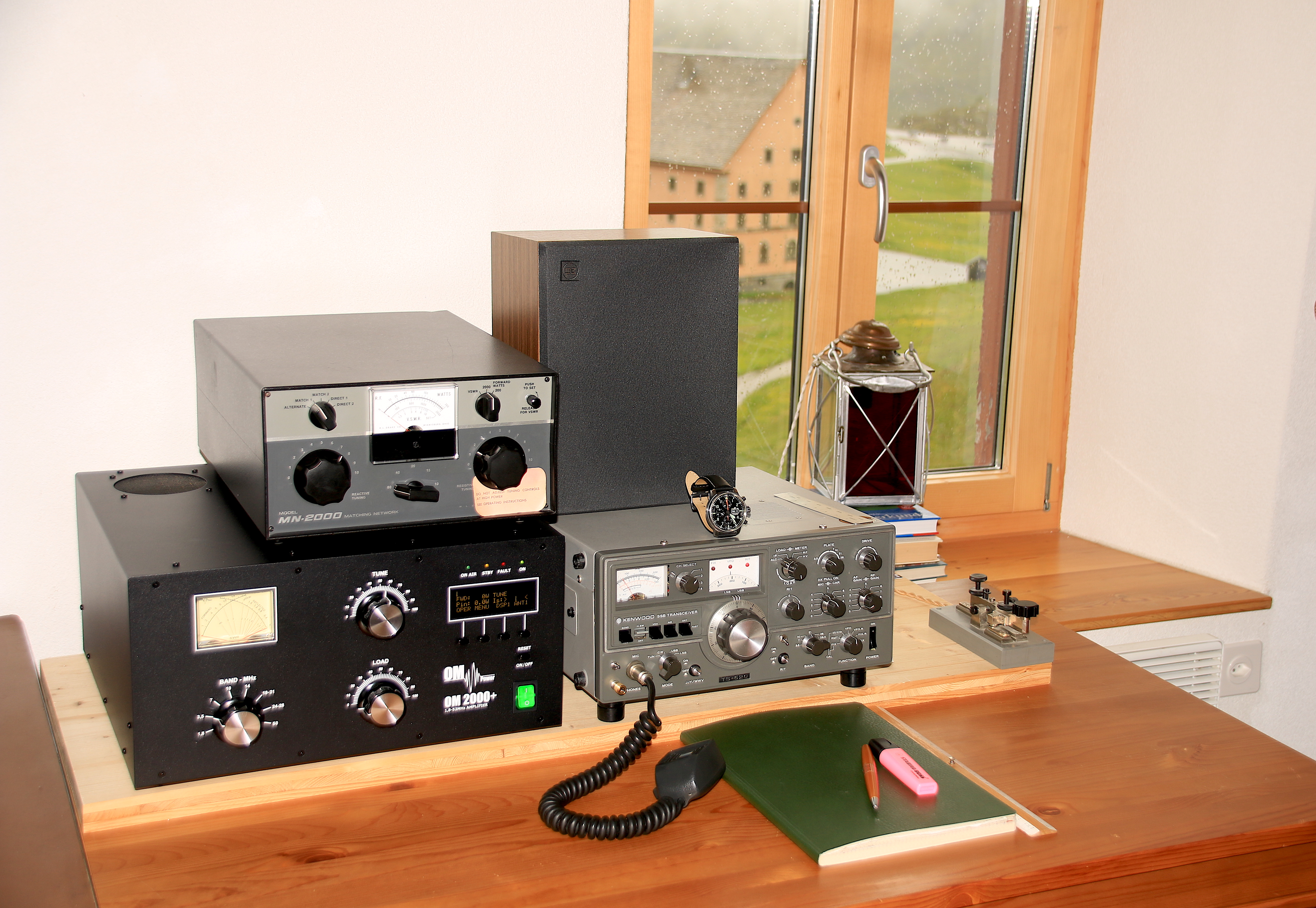
An amateur radio station with a power amplifier from OM-Power (black box at left hand side)

Some commercially manufactured one to two kilowatt linear amplifiers used in amateur radio still use vacuum tubes (valves) and can provide 10 to 20 times RF power amplification (10 to 13 dB). For example, a transmitter driving the input with 100 watts will be amplified to 2,000 watts (2 kW) output to the antenna. Solid state linear amplifiers are more common in the 1000-watt range and can be driven by as little as 5 watts. Modern power devices using LDMOS technology allow for more efficient, cost-effective linear RF power amplifiers for the amateur radio community.

Large vacuum-tube linear amplifiers generally rely on one or more vacuum tubes supplied by a very high voltage power supply to convert large amounts of electrical energy into radio frequency energy. Linear amplifiers need to operate with class-A or class-AB biasing, which makes them relatively inefficient. While class C has far higher efficiency, a class-C amplifier is not linear, and is only suitable for the amplification of constant envelope signals. Such signals include FM, FSK, MFSK, and CW (Morse code).

== Broadcast radio stations ==
The output stages of professional AM radio broadcast transmitters of up to 50 kW need to be linear and are now usually constructed using solid state technologies. Large vacuum tubes are still used for international long, medium, and shortwave broadcast transmitters from 500 kW up to 2 MW.

== See also ==
- Amplifiers
- Electronic amplifier
