= Predistortion =

Technique used to improve radio transmitters

Predistortion is a technique used to improve the linearity of radio transmitter amplifiers.

Radio transmitter amplifiers in most telecommunications systems are required to be "linear", in that they must accurately reproduce the signal present at their input. An amplifier that compresses its input or has a non-linear input/output relationship causes the output signal to splatter onto adjacent radio frequencies. This causes interference on other radio channels.

There are many different ways of specifying the linearity of a power amplifier, including P1dB, inter-modulation distortion (IMD), AM-to-PM, spectral regrowth and noise power ratio (NPR). For a truly linear system, these measures are in a sense all equivalent. That is, a power amplifier with low inter-modulation distortion will also have low spectral regrowth and low AM-to-PM distortion. Likewise there are two equivalent ways of conceptualizing how predistortion amplifiers work: correcting gain and phase distortions, or cancelling inter-modulation products. Usually one of the two conceptualizations is preferred when designing predistortion circuitry; however the end result is generally the same. A predistorter designed to correct gain and phase non-linearities will also improve IMD, while one which targets inter-modulation products will also reduce gain and phase perturbations.

When combined with the target amplifier, the linearizer produces an overall system that is more linear and reduces the amplifier's distortion. In essence, "inverse distortion" is introduced into the input of the amplifier, thereby cancelling any non-linearity the amplifier might have.

Predistortion is a cost-saving and power efficiency technique. Radio power amplifiers tend to become more non-linear as their output power increases towards their maximum rated output. Predistortion is a way to get more usable power from the amplifier, without having to build a larger, less efficient and more expensive amplifier. Another important consideration in design of RF power amplifiers is the memory effect or amplifier nonlinear dynamics.

Predistortion can be implemented in an analog as well as digital manner known as digital pre-distortion.
