= Diccionario panhispánico de dudas =

Dictionary of the proper use of Spanish

- Language: Spanish
- Publisher: Royal Spanish Academy
- Publication date: 2005
- Pages: 883
- ISBN: 8429406239

The Diccionario Panhispánico de dudas (DPD; English: Pan-Hispanic Dictionary of Questions) is an elaborate work undertaken by the Royal Spanish Academy and the Association of Academies of the Spanish Language with the goal of resolving questions related to the proper use of the Spanish language. Like other publications of the academy, such as the Diccionario de la lengua española, the work follows a linguistically prescriptive philosophy as opposed to a descriptive one. The first edition was published in 2005 and is now being revised to more properly align with principles set forth by the academy's other publications.

The project was begun in response to the 50,000 questions received yearly by the constituent members of the Association of Spanish Language Academies.

It is composed of:

- The dictionary itself,
- A set of five appendices covering conjugation of verbs, abbreviations, symbols that can be ordered alphabetically, other symbols, and demonyms,
- A glossary of linguistic terminology,
- And a list of works cited.
