= Spectral regrowth =

Spectral regrowth is the intermodulation products generated in the presence of a digital transmitter added to an analog communication system.
