= Duct (industrial exhaust) =

Pipe systems

Industrial exhaust ducts are pipe systems that connect hoods to industrial chimneys through other components of exhaust systems like fans, collectors, etc. Ducts are low-pressure pneumatic conveyors to convey dust, particles, shavings, fumes, or chemical hazardous components from air in the vicinity to a shop floor or any other specific locations like tanks, sanding machines, or laboratory hoods. Ducts can be fabricated from a variety of materials including carbon steel, stainless steel, PVC, and fiberglass. They can be fabricated through rolling (preferable for ducts of 12" or more in diameter) or extruded (for ducts up to 18").

HVAC systems do not include this category of industrial application, namely exhaust systems. A distinction from HVAC system ducts is that the fluid (air) conveyed through the duct system may not be homogeneous. An industrial exhaust duct system is primarily a pneumatic conveying system and is basically governed by laws of flow of fluids.

== Fluid flow ==
The conveying fluid that flows through the duct system is air. Air transports materials from the hood to a destination. It is also instrumental in capturing the material into the flow system. Air is a compressible fluid, but for engineering calculations, air is considered as incompressible as a simplification, without any significant errors.

== Design ==
Process design of exhaust system will include

- Identification of contaminants, their density and size
- Deciding of air flow
- Sizing of the ductwork
- Calculation of resistance
- Finalizing the capacity of blower, etc.

The goal is to keep contaminants out using minimum airflow. It is estimated that increase in an inch wg of static pressure can add a few thousands of dollars to the operation cost per annum.

== See also ==
- Darcy friction factor Friction factor for designing duct systems.
- Colebrook equation
- Process Duct Work
- Air quality
