= Suction pressure =

Suction pressure is also called Diffusion Pressure Deficit. If some solute is dissolved in solvent, its diffusion pressure decreases. The difference between diffusion pressure of pure solvent and solution is called diffusion pressure deficit (DPD). It is a reduction in the diffusion pressure of solvent in the solution over its pure state due to the presence of solutes in it and forces opposing diffusion.

When a plant cell is placed in a hypotonic solution, water enters into a cell by endosmosis and as a result turgor pressure (TP) develops in the cell. The cell membrane becomes stretched and the osmotic pressure (OP) of the cell decreases. As the cell absorbs more and more water its turgor pressure increases and osmotic pressure decreases. When a cell is fully turgid, its OP is equal to TP and DPD is zero. Turgid cells cannot absorb any more water. Thus, with reference to plant cells, the DPD can be described as the actual thirst of a cell for water and can be expressed as :

$DPD = OP-TP$

Thus it is DPD that tends to equate and represents the water-absorbing ability of a cell, it is also called suction force (SF) or suction pressure (SP). The actual pressure with which a cell absorbs water is called "suction pressure".

== Factors affecting DPD ==
- DPD is directly proportional to the height of the plant, tree or organism.
- DPD is governed by two factors i.e. turgor pressure and osmotic pressure. Turgor pressure can be denoted as wall pressure in some cases.
- DPD is directly proportional to the concentration of the solution. DPD decreases with dilution of the solution.

== History ==
The term diffusion pressure deficit (DPD) was coined by B.S. Meyer in 1938. Originally DPD was described as suction pressure by German botanist Otto Renner in 1915.

== Refrigeration ==
In refrigeration and air conditioning systems, the suction pressure' (also called the low-side pressure) is the intake pressure generated by the system compressor while operating. The suction pressure, along with the suction temperature the wet bulb temperature of the discharge air are used to determine the correct refrigerant charge in a system.
